= Benjamin Shaw (musician) =

- Genres: Indie, alternative, folk, experimental, lo-fi
- Occupations: Musician, artist
- Label: Audio Antihero

Benjamin Shaw is an English-Canadian musician and artist based in Melbourne, Australia. He has recorded for a number of different labels but is a mainstay of Audio Antihero records. He also uses the monickers of Guppy and Megadead.

== Biography ==
Benjamin Shaw released his debut EP "I Got the Pox, the Pox is What I Got" in October 2009 on Audio Antihero which saw airplay from BBC 6 Music on the Tom Ravenscroft, Gideon Coe, Steve Lamacq, Jon Holmes and Tom Robinson shows and positive reviews from publications such as The Skinny, The 405, The Music Fix, This Is Fake DIY, Clash Music and The Line of Best Fit who remarked "If you think you've heard the like of Benjamin Shaw before, think again. TLOBF recommended.".

In October 2011 it was announced on sites like Drowned in Sound, Bearded and This Is Fake DIY that he would be releasing first album, There's Always Hope, There's Always Cabernet. He began promoting the album with a series of sessions for the likes of The Fly, The 405, This Is Fake DIY, Triple R, The Line of Best Fit, Dandelion Radio and Resonance FM.

The debut LP There's Always Hope, There's Always Cabernet was released on 21 November to positive reviews. Drowned in Sound called it "superb," Clash Music remarked that Shaw was "an outcast, a loner, a maverick and a freak. All of these are compliments," The Line of Best Fit claimed "you wouldn't want everyone (or anyone else) to sound to like Benjamin Shaw but I'm delighted someone does," Is This Music? awarded it 4/5 and called it "one of the better records of the year" and MusicOMH gave it 4/5 and hailed it as a "truly special album." Album tracks "The Birds Chirp & The Sun Shines" and "Interview" were given multiple plays on the Tom Ravenscroft and Gideon Coe BBC 6 Music shows, as were the album's first single "Somewhere Over the M6" and its B-side "Pig".

Shaw has played around the UK, Europe and Australia with artists such as Darren Hayman, Tom Paley (New Lost City Ramblers), Jack Hayter (Ex-Hefner), Neil Pennycook (Meursault), Extradition Order, Paul Hawkins & The Awkward Silences, Runaround Kids, Little Red and The Owl Service. Shaw has also seen endorsements from Nic Dalton of The Lemonheads.

During a radio interview on 12 August 2012, Audio Antihero founder Jamie Halliday revealed that Benjamin Shaw was working on new material for a future release with the label. The first piece of new material to surface was the "T'ra F'now" instrumental on the Audio Antihero produced "Hüsker Doo-wop" Charity EP to raise money to repair damages to independent music organisations in New York following Hurricane Sandy. Shaw followed up his contribution to this charity EP with "This Christmas (I Just Want to be Left Alone)," a collaborative Christmas single with Fighting Kites to raise money for Shelter, Shaw also directed the music video. The single benefited from critical praise from online press and radio and saw support from Tom Robinson, Bush Radio, Jon Solomon's WPRB show and Rolling Stone.

On 14 January, it was announced that Benjamin Shaw would releasing a new instrumental record entitled Summer in the Box Room on the Glass Reservoir label in February 2013. Two tracks from the record were premiered by Robert Rotifer on 4FM and GoldFlakePaint praised it as a "special kind of dour musical genius." Tom Ravenscroft also aired tracks from the release on his BBC Radio 6 Music show. During this time, Shaw would sometimes perform live with Neil Debnam (Fighting Kites/Broken Shoulder) and Kay Ishikawa (Comet Gain) as Benjamin Shaw Band.

Alternating between labels and self-releasing his new music, Shaw issued Goodbye, Cagoule World in 2014, the instrumental Guppy in 2015, One Day We'll Laugh at All This under the name Guppy, and Megadead in 2018, which initially premiered on The Alternative. Shaw then adopted the Megadead name for a number of releases.

In 2025, Shaw announced a trilogy of ambient titles to be released under his own name via Handrawn Hand, produced remixes for Leilani Patao, and Jeff Parker. His 2009 song "When I Fell Over in the City" was also featured, alongside his Audio Antihero label-mates, Tiberius and CIAO MALZ, on the Rue Defense Tape Club December cassette compilation.

== Discography ==
=== Albums, EPs and compilations ===
- I Got the Pox, the Pox is What I Got EP (Audio Antihero, 2009)
- Rumfucker (Self-Release, 2010 / Rumfucker Recordings, 2016)
- There's Always Hope, There's Always Cabernet (Audio Antihero, 2011)
- Summer in the Box Room (Glass Reservoir, 2013)
- Goodbye, Cagoule World (Audio Antihero, 2014)
- Guppy (Kirigirisu Recordings, 2015)
- One Day We'll Laugh About All This (Self-Released, 2016) as Guppy
- Megadead (Audio Antihero / Kirigirsu Recordings, 2018)
- Exciting Opportunities: A Collection of Sadness and Singles (Audio Antihero / Old Money Records, 2019)
- Should've Stayed at Home: A Collection of Oddities and Outtakes (Audio Antihero / Old Money Records, 2019)
- Live at donaufestival (Audio Antihero, 2019)
- I Got the Pox, the Pox is What I Got (Remastered & Expanded) (Audio Antihero / Old Money Records, 2020)
- There's Always Hope, There's Always Cabernet (Remastered & Expanded) (Audio Antihero / Old Money Records, 2020)
- Screams, Banging, etc (Self-Released, 2020) as Megadead
- Audio Visual Metro Computers (Self-Released, 2020) as Megadead
- 31 Songs About Murder (Self-Released, 2021) as Megadead
- Authentic Country Music (Self-Released, 2021) as Megadead
- Tragedy, Doom & So On (Hand Drawn Hand, 2022) as Megadead
- Passive Listening / Doom Scrolling (Self-Released, 2023) as Megadead

=== Sessions ===
- I Got the Pox, the Pox is What I Got – EP (Audio Antihero, 2009)
- WVUM Sessions – Split with Broken Shoulder (BarelyOut Recordings, 2011)
- Dandelion Session (BarelyOut Recordings, 2011)
- The Shuttleworth Sessions (Self-Release, 2012)
- The Waiting Room Session (BarelyOut Recordings, 2014)
- Dandelion Sessions (BarelyOut Recordings, 2014)

=== Singles ===
- "When I Fell Over in the City" / "The Carpeteer" (Audio Antihero, 2011)
- "Somewhere Over the M6" (Audio Antihero, 2011)
- "This Christmas (I Just Want to be Left Alone)" with Fighting Kites (Fika Recordings, 2011 / Audio Antihero, 2012)
- "The Birds Chirp & The Sun Shines" (Audio Antihero, 2012)
- "Goodbye, Kagoul World" (Audio Antihero, 2014)
- "You & Me – EP" split with Jack Hayter, Cloud and Broken Shoulder (Audio Antihero, 2014)
- "Terrible Feelings!" (Audio Antihero / Kirigirsu Recordings, 2018)
- "A Brand New Day (Live at Donaufestival)" (Audio Antihero, 2019)
- "Sad Dog Waiting for Pizza" (Self-Released, 2021) as Megadead
- "It Goes / It Gone"(Self-Released, 2021) as Megadead
- "Country" (Self-Released, 2021) as Megadead

=== Compilation appearances ===
- Cigarettes & Eggnog (HI54LOFI, 2009) – contributes "It's Christmas Time (For God's Sake)" (Nosferatu D2 cover) and hidden track
- Show Me A Word That Rhymes With Pavement (Filthy Little Angels, 2010) – contributes "Starlings of the Slipstream" (Pavement cover)
- Bob Hope would – for Japan (Audio Antihero, 2011) – contributes "Kick The Dog" (Demo) / "When I Fell Over in the City" (Alt. Mix) and "Pig" + Artwork
- Some.Alternate.Universe – for FSID (Audio Antihero, 2012) – contributes "Long Ago & Oh So Far Away" + Artwork
- Audio Antihero's Commercial Suicide Sampler (Audio Antihero, 2012) – contributes "How To Test The Depth of a Well" + Artwork
- The Hüsker Doo-wop EP for New York (Audio Antihero/Hear It For NY, 2012) – contributes "T'ra F'now"
- Into The Light: Volume Two for Pussy Riot (Unwashed Territories, 2012) – contributes "This Christmas (I Just Want to be Left Alone)" with Fighting Kites
- I Love You & Stuff (HI54LOFI, 2013) – contributes "Internet Girlfriend"
- Audio Antihero Presents: "REGAL VS STEAMBOAT" for Rape Crisis (Audio Antihero, 2013) – contributes "Goodbye, Cagoule World (Live)" + Artwork
- Five Long Years - (Audio Antihero, 2014) - contributes "Goodbye, Kagoul World" / "Hello Sunshine" (Hidden) + Artwork
- New Emperors - (My Little Empire Records, 2015) - contributes "You & Me"
- an electrical storm - (Aetheric Records, 2015) - contributes "Le Pleasure Beach"
- BERN YR IDOLS (Bernie Sanders benefit compilation (Audio Antihero, 2016) - contributes "How to Test the Depth of a Well (Triple R Session)" + Artwork + Mastering
- Audio Antihero Presents: "Unpresidented Jams" for SPLC & NILC - (Audio Antihero, 2017) - contributes "Hole" + Additional Mastering + Additional Design
- The Desperation Club - A Cloud Tribute Compilation - (Audio Antihero, 2018) - contributes "Trees All Right" + Mastering (Tracks 2-35)
- Fall 2018 - (Z Tapes, 2018) - contributes "Kick the Dog"
- Elder Statesman: Nine Long Years of Audio Antihero Records (Audio Antihero, 2019) - contributes "You & Me" + Artwork
- Fighting Kites - Mustard After Dinner - An Anthology of Fighting Kites (Audio Antihero / Old Money Records, 2019) - contributes "This Christmas" (I Just Want to Be Left Alone) + Mastering
- Vessels IX (Future Astronauts, 2021) - contributes "Tragedy, Doom & So On"
- From the River to the Sea: The Horrible Truth About Palestine - a Fundraiser for the United Palestinian Appeal (Audio Antihero, 2021) - contributes "Chief of the Dead" / "Dead Kennedys" (with Broken Broken Bastard) + Artwork + Mastering
- Rue Defense Tape Club: December (Rue Defense, 2025) - contributes "When I Fell Over in the City"

=== Other credits ===
- Jack Hayter – Sucky Tart (Audio Antihero, 2011) – Artwork + Mastering
- Broken Shoulder – Broken Shoulderrr (Audio Antihero, 2011) – Mastering
- Wartgore Hellsnicker – Moderate Rock (Audio Antihero, 2011) – Artwork + Mastering
- Paul Hawkins & The Awkward Silences – The Wrong Life (Audio Antihero, 2011) – Artwork
- Fighting Kites & Broken Shoulder – Split (Audio Antihero, 2011) – Mastering (Tracks 5–7)
- Paul Hawkins & The Awkward Silences – You Can't Make Somebody Love You / Of Course I Stole The Train (Audio Antihero, 2011) – Artwork
- Broken Shoulder – Stiller Nite (Audio Antihero / Fika Recordings Calendar, 2011) – Artwork + Mastering
- Nosferatu D2 – It's Christmas Time (For God's Sake) (Audio Antihero / Fika Recordings Calendar, 2011) – Artwork
- Broken Shoulder – The Tape of Disquiet (Tape Your Mouth, 2012) – Mastering
- Jack Hayter – The Shackleton (Audio Antihero, 2012) – Artwork + Mastering
- Broken Shoulder – Holloway Exit Music / Fun Juice (Deathbomb Arc, 2012) – Mastering
- Nosferatu D2 – Live at the Spitz (Audio Antihero/BarelyOut Recordings, 2012) – Remastering
- Broken Shoulder – Crow Versus Crow session (BarelyOut Recordings, 2012) – Mastering
- D.E.A.D. – S.T.I.L.L. D.E.A.D. (GM Sounds, 2012) – Artwork
- a Singer of Songs – There is a Home for You (HI54LOFI, 2013) – Artwork
- Broken Shoulder - Title Track (Self-Released, 2013) – Mastering
- Broken Shoulder - Sawara (Self-Released, 2013) – Mastering
- Jack Hayter – Quotes (Audio Antihero, 2013) – Artwork
- Me and the Horse I Rode in On - Driving Home for Christmas (Self-Release, 2014) - Artwork
- Broken Shoulder - 300 Bicycle Seats (Kirigirisu Recordings, 2014) - Mastering
- Frog – Judy Garland (Audio Antihero, 2015) – Artwork
- Me and the Horse I Rode in On - When You're Down (EardrumsPop, 2015) - Artwork
- Frog – Kind of Blah (Audio Antihero, 2015) – Artwork
- Frog – Photograph (Audio Antihero, 2015) – Design + Mastering (Track 2)
- Nosferatu D2 – Older, Wiser, Sadder EP (Audio Antihero, 2015) – Design + Remastering
- Frog – Catchyalater (Audio Antihero, 2016) – Remixer (Track 4) + Mastering (Tracks 3 & 4)
- Charles Griffin Gibson – People (Self-Release, 2016) - Remastering
- Charles Griffin Gibson – Pictures (Self-Release, 2016) - Remastering
- CHUCK - My Band Is a Computer (Audio Antihero / Old Money Records) - Mastering
- Broken Shoulder - Biwa (Self-Released, 2016) – Mastering
- Broken Shoulder - Hashiridase (Kirigirisu Recordings, 2016) - Mastering
- Magana - Inches Apart (Audio Antihero, 2017) - Remixer (Track 3) + Mastering (Tracks 2 & 3)
- CHUCK - New Yorker (Audio Antihero, 2017) - Mastering
- CHUCK - Cherry Tree (Audio Antihero, 2017) - Mastering
- CHUCK - Frankenstein Songs for the Grocery Store (Audio Antihero, 2017) - Mastering
- Max García Conover - Motorhome (Son Canciones, 2017) - Mastering
- Magana - Oceans (Audio Antihero, 2017) - Mastering
- CHUCK - Happy Birthday (Audio Antihero, 2017) - Remixer (Track 3) + Mastering
- Cloud - Wildfire (Audio Antihero, 2018) - Mastering (Track 2)
- Cloud - Two Hands Bound (Audio Antihero, 2018) - Mastering (Track 2)
- Cloud - Me, Her & Lavender (Audio Antihero, 2018) - Mastering (Track 2)
- Frog - Something to Hide (Audio Antihero, 2018) - Artwork
- Frog - American (Audio Antihero, 2018) - Artwork
- Frog - Bones (Audio Antihero, 2018) - Artwork
- Frog - Whatever We Probably Already Had It (Audio Antihero, 2018) - Artwork
- Nipped in the Bud - Fed Up With It (Kirigirisu Recordings, 2018) - Mastering
- Atlanta Dream Season - Party in the Hospital / Great (The Popside, 2018) - Artwork
- Frog - God Once Loved a Woman (Audio Antihero, 2019) - Artwork
- Tempertwig - Comfort Blanket / Everything Can Be Derailed (Audio Antihero / Randy Sadage Records, 2019) - Artwork + Mastering
- Tempertwig - This Means Everything / Randy Sadage Records, This Means Don't a Thing (Audio Antihero, 2019) - Artwork + Mastering
- Tempertwig - Apricot (Audio Antihero / Randy Sadage Records, 2019) - Artwork + Mastering
- Tempertwig - FAKE NOSTALGIA: An Anthology of Broken Stuff (Audio Antihero / Randy Sadage Records, 2019) - Artwork + Mastering
- Tempertwig - Films Without Plotlines EP (Audio Antihero / Randy Sadage Records, 2019) - Artwork + Mastering
- Frog - Black Friday (Audio Antihero / Tape Wormies, 2019) - Artwork
- Frog - It's Something I Do (Audio Antihero / Tape Wormies, 2019) - Artwork
- Frog - Count Bateman (Audio Antihero / Tape Wormies, 2019) - Artwork
- Broken Shoulder - Mizul (Self-Released, 2023) – Mastering
- Broken Shoulder - Vorst (Self-Released, 2023) – Mastering
- Broken Shoulder - Shark Islands: A Broken Shoulder Archipelago (Audio Antihero / Old Money Records, 2019) - Artwork + Mastering
- Atlanta Dream Season - Green Means Stop (The Popside, 2020) - Remixer (Track 1)
- Broken Shoulder - Tokyo / Montréal (Jeunesse Cosmique, 2019) – Mastering
- CHUCK – Nothing Matters to Me Now (Audio Antihero / Old Money Records, 2024) - Mastering
- My Best Unbeaten Brother – Time on Our Hands, Spider-Man – Single (Audio Antihero, 2024) - Mastering
- My Best Unbeaten Brother – Extraordinary Times – Single (Audio Antihero, 2024) - Mastering
- My Best Unbeaten Brother – Blues Fatigue – Single (Audio Antihero, 2024) - Mastering
- My Best Unbeaten Brother – Pessimistic Pizza (Audio Antihero, 2024) - Mastering
- Broken Shoulder - Kaeri (MRM Recordings, 2025) – Mastering
- The Noisy - The Secret Ingredient Is Even More Meat (Audio Antihero, 2025) - Remaster (Track 14)
- Leilani Patao - Red Hair Dye – Single (Audio Antihero, 2025) - Remixer (Track 3) + Mastering (Tracks 2–3)
- Jeff Parker - The Hard Way in to The Way Out of Easy (International Anthem, 2025)- Remixer (Track 3)
- Leilani Patao - daisy deluxe (Audio Antihero, 2026) - Remixer (Track 11)
