= Fighting Kites =

English indie rock band

- Origin: North London, UK
- Genres: Indie rock, Post-Rock, Noise, Ambient, Instrumental
- Years active: 2006–2012
- Label: Audio Antihero / Variant Records
- Past members: Neil Debnam; Daniel Fordham; David Stewart; Luke Johnson
- Website: http://www.fightingkites.bandcamp.com

Fighting Kites were an English instrumental indie rock band from North London, England. They have been praised by Indie press and BBC radio for their unique approach to contemporary instrumental rock music, taking their influences from '60s pop/R&B outfits like The Shadows and Booker T & The MGs as well as Japanese Noise acts.

== Biography ==
Fighting Kites began as a duo of Neil Debnam and Daniel Fordham in 2006, they issued one self-titled EP under this line-up before bringing bassist David Stewart into the fold. They showcased this bulkier sound on 2009's self-released "Vlaams Tapes" before bringing in fourth member, Luke Johnson. The band continued to play live on bills in Belgium, Los Angeles and London with the likes of Male Bonding, Ruins, Vampillia, Jack Hayter (ex-Hefner), Shoes and Socks Off, Benjamin Shaw, Paul Hawkins, Ben Parker (Nosferatu D2) and Nisennenmondai. In 2009 they also provided musical accompaniment to a reading by author Stuart Evers who is a fan of the group.

In 2011, Fighting Kites founder Neil Debnam issued his first solo release under the Broken Shoulder name, entitled "BROKEN SHOULDERRR." This record was released by Audio Antihero and was well received by press, leading also to a number of radio sessions for the likes of Resonance FM, WVUMFM, Phoenix FM, Bush Radio and Dandelion Radio. As a result of this of working relationship, Fighting Kites would contribute a recording of "Carlos Mends Shoulder" to Audio Antihero's "Bob Hope would." charity compilation to raise money for Shelterbox, Red Cross and others following the Japan Earthquake and Tsnuami. Due to increasing delays with the release of Fighting Kites' debut album on account of their Gravid Hands label folding, Fighting Kites would record a new set of songs to issue as an EP with the Audio Antihero label, which was released as a split with Broken Shoulder in October 2011 (distributed by PMD). The EP found supporters at The 405, The Music Fix and other alternative music press sites. Their most notable support however came from BBC 6Music DJ Gideon Coe who began playing tracks from the EP on a frequent basis, continuing into 2012 and introducing them to their biggest audience yet. In this time, they would also record a live session for the "Hello GoodBye Show" on London's Resonance FM and these recordings would be released by BarelyOut Recordings soon after. Their final release from this period would come in the shape of a collaborative Christmas single with Benjamin Shaw entitled "This Christmas (I Just Want to be Left Alone)" which was given away with on 23 December as a part of the Fika Recordings/Darren Hayman (The French) Digital Advent Calendar. They appeared alongside such Audio Antihero artists/alumni as Nosferatu D2, Broken Shoulder, Jack Hayter, Paul Hawkins and Ian Button (also of Death In Vegas).

In 2012 with their debut LP finally ready for release on Variant Records, Fighting Kites issued another track, "Northern Territory," via Audio Antihero on the "Some.Alternate.Universe" compilation to raise money for FSID to help prevent Infant Death Syndrome. The compilation was very well received by press, including The 405, Bearded, God Is in the TV, Bearded, The Line of Best Fit and many more and it featured artists like Jeffrey Lewis, Eddie Argos (Art Brut), Jonah Matranga (onelinedrawing/Far/New End Original), Johnny Foreigner, Still Corners, Antony Harding and many more.

Fighting Kites at last released their self-titled debut album on 7 May 2012 via Variant Records, similar to the previous EP, the album had a great response from Indie Press like The 405, God Is In The TV, This Is Fake DIY and numerous others. Again, Gideon Coe showed his support by airing numerous songs from the album as deep into 2012 as December. The album would also receive BBC airplay from Tom Ravenscroft (son of broadcaster John Peel).

In December 2012, Audio Antihero re-issued "This Christmas (I Just Want to be Left Alone" as a Christmas single to raise money for Shelter. The single benefited from critical praise from online press/radio and support from BBC broadcaster and Tom Robinson Band founder Tom Robinson as well as Jon Solomon at WPRB, Steve Wide at RRRFM and a mention on Rolling Stone. This song was also included on an Unwashed Territories compilation to raise money and awareness for Pussy Riot.

In addition to BBC DJs like Coe, Ravenscroft and Robinson, their music has been aired internationally on stations like DIY Radio, Dandelion Radio, Resonance FM, WVUM, WPRB, Big Scary Monsters Radio, Kooba Radio, Bush Radio, Radio Tircoed, Susy Radio 103.FM, WMBR and many others.

Since the band dissolved, Fordham and Stewart went on to form The Drink in late 2012 with Dearbhla Minogue. The group released two albums via Melodic and performed with Fighting Kites label mates Frog (who Debnam also remixed)

== Discography ==
=== Album ===
- Fighting Kites – LP (Variant Records, 2012)

=== EPs ===
- Fighting Kites – EP (Self-Release, 2006)
- SPLIT EP with Broken Shoulder (Audio Antihero, 2011)

=== Single ===
- "This Christmas (I Just Want to be Left Alone)" with Benjamin Shaw (Fika Recordings/Audio Antihero, 2011/2012)

=== Compilation albums ===
- Mustard After Dinner – An Anthology of Fighting Kites (Audio Antihero / Old Money Records, 2019)

=== Sessions and live releases ===
- The Vlaams Tapes (Self-Release, 2009)
- Resonance FM Session (17/09/2011) (BarelyOut Recordings, 2011)

=== Compilation appearances ===
- Bob Hope would – for Japan (Audio Antihero, 2011) – contributes "Carlos Mends Shoulder (rough mix)"
- Some.Alternate.Universe – for FSID (Audio Antihero, 2012) – contributes "Northern Territory"
- Audio Antihero's Commercial Suicide Sampler (Audio Antihero, 2012) – contributes "Wojtek The Bear"
- Into The Light: Volume Two for Pussy Riot (Unwashed Territories, 2012) – contributes "This Christmas (I Just Want to be Left Alone)"
- Audio Antihero Presents: "REGAL VS STEAMBOAT" for Rape Crisis (2013) – contributes "Grey Starling (Live)"
- Elder Statesman: Nine Long Years of Audio Antihero Records (Audio Antihero, 2019) – contributes "FR."
