= Jack Hayter =

British musician

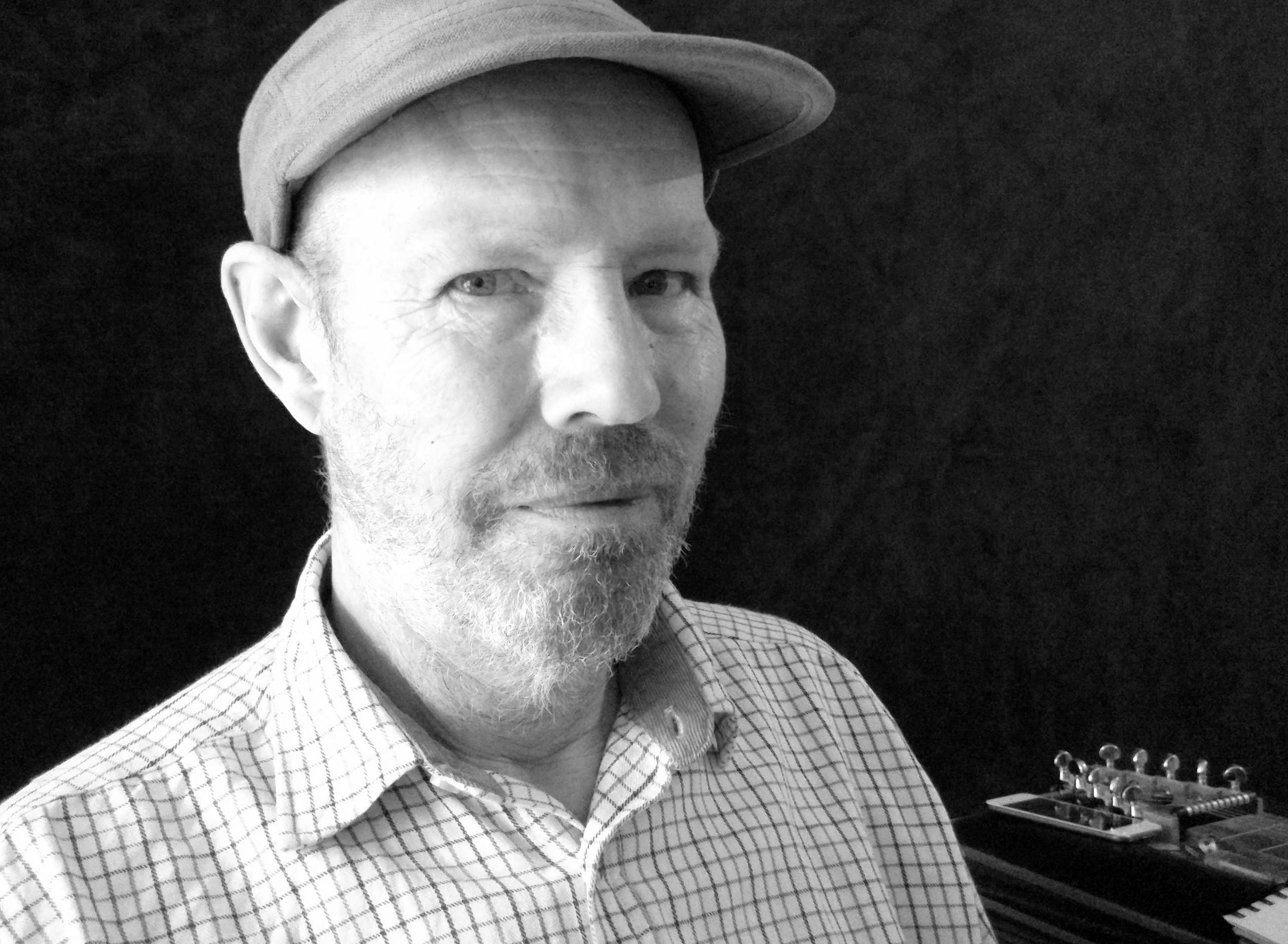
- Jack Hayter July 2020 (photo by Maria Suffolk)

Background information
- Genres: Folk, Indie, Experimental, Lo-Fi, Country
- Occupations: Musician, Poet, Filmmaker
- Labels: Audio Antihero, Absolutely Kosher

Jack Hayter is a British multi-instrumentalist and singer-songwriter, he is a former member of Hefner.

== Biography ==
=== Early years and Spongefinger ===
Jack Hayter debuted with the alt.country group Spongefinger, who released albums via Volcano Records/Cargo Distribution. The group were referred to as "Dennis Hopper's House Band" by Organ and NME press. They also served as the backing band on the "Immortal Rich" album by TV Smith (of The Adverts) in 1996. During this time he also contributed to the "Big Stick" EP from Rhatigan.

=== Hefner (1998–2002) ===
Hayter came into prominence when he joined Hefner full-time in 1999 as a multi-instrumentalist (though he had been playing live with them in 1998), alongside Darren Hayman, Antony Harding and John Morrison. In Hefner, Hayter recorded and released numerous albums, singles and EPs for the Too Pure label. They had several top 75 singles and recorded a number of sessions for John Peel and Steve Lamacq.

Hefner would play all over the world, including sets at festivals like Festival Internacional de Benicàssim, Big Chill Festival, V Festival and headline slots at Festivals like Reading & Leeds. They would also play bills with artists like Sebadoh, Elliott Smith, Flaming Lips, Billy Bragg and Life Without Buildings.

Hefner disbanded in 2002 after the "Dead Media" album on which Jack Hayter gave his first lead vocal performance. Jack would later compile the posthumous live album "Kick, Snare, Hats, Ride" and provide liner notes for "The Best of Hefner".

=== Solo (2001–present) ===
Since Hefner went quiet in 2001, Hayter debuted as a solo artist with the solo album "Practical Wireless" on Absolutely Kosher Records. Pitchfork complimented Jack's voice, calling it "one of the weariest, most world-beaten voices around" and remarked that "Hefner's just holding you back, Jack."

He made his solo return at the start of 2011. Hayter signed with UK independent record label Audio Antihero and released a new EP called "Sucky Tart". The EP was well received by press with isthismusic? giving it 5/5, The Organ naming it their 'thing of the day' and calling it "his finest moments yet" and The Line of Best Fit praised him for having "the imagination to break from the usually tough (and boring/overdone/tiresome) grasps of folk".

Tom Robinson played "I Stole The Cutty Sark" prior to release on his BBC 6 Music show and "A Doll's House" was subsequently played by Tom Ravenscroft. Hayter promoted the release with sessions for regional stations like Resonance FM, X-Stream East and Dandelion Radio.

In April 2012, Hayter unveiled his next project, "The Sisters of St. Anthony" – a 12 part singles series, to last a full year. The series was launched with a show opening for The Wave Pictures and live sessions for the likes of This Is Fake DIY, Phoenix FM and Triple R FM. The series has featured musical contributions from Hefner alumni Darren Hayman and Antony Harding and guest artwork from Benjamin Shaw and Sexton Ming. The series enjoyed praise and acclaim from press and radio, including Tom Robinson's Fresh on the Net, 4FM, GoldFlakePaint, 7BitArcade, The Music Fix, This Is Fake DIY, The 405 and others.

In November 2012, Hayter contributed a re-working of his "The West Beach" single for the Audio Antihero produced "Hüsker Doo-wop" Charity EP to raise money to repair damages to independent music organisations in New York following Hurricane Sandy. On 17 December, Hayter gave his final live session of 2012 for "The Wrong Rock Show" on Bush Radio. The show was co-hosted by Audio Antihero and included a session from label-mate and Fighting Kites guitarist Broken Shoulder.

Hayter recorded a session for The Joyzine Radio Show on Croydon Radio in 2013 and the, "Charlotte Badger" single was played FM4. Follow up single "Sisters of St. Anthony" featured guest vocals from Suzanne Rhatigan.

In July 2017 The WIAIWYA label commissioned and released a 77 minute long lighthouse inspired concept piece called "Flashes and Occultations" by Hayter. Tracing the journey of a light-vessel captain and drawing on the imagery of 1940's propaganda films such as Men of the Lightship. The Irish poet Aoife Mannix supplied some poetry This was one of a series of 7 such pieces produced for the label by 7 acts. Hayter also contributed to the Papernut Cambridge contributionto the 77 at 7 series ("Anything You Touch is Art")

=== Other post-Hefner works ===
In 2008, Hayter and Darren Hayman toured playing Hefner songs. Hayter has contributed to various post-Hefner projects from both ANT and Hayman, and both of them appear on his "Sisters of St. Anthony" singles series.

Hayter has collaborated with progressive folktronica act Dollboy.

Hayter also contributed the music to John Hardwick's short film To Have And To Hold, which starred Susanne Lothar. He has had two poems published in the second Tall Lighthouse poetry review "Automatic Lighthouse" (ISBN 1 904551 24 6). Since 2008, he has also worked with the British Film Institute on various educational film projects made with children in North Kent.

He also contributed to projects from the Gare Du Nord label (co-run by Ian Button), performing on recordings and live shows by Raleigh Long and Papernut Cambridge. Hayter also played Pedal Steel on Mark Fry's 2014 album, South Wind, Clear Sky.

Since 2014, Hayter has been a member of Papernut Cambridge, The 1980s inspired electronic soul band FXU2 Ralegh Long's and Non-Blank (a Hastings-based arts project with Oliver Cherer, Riz Maslen and Darren Morris) Non-Blank have performed a number of improvised soundtracks to classic films in South coast independent cinemas and at The Latitude Festival in 2017.

On February 1, 2025, Jack Hayter contributed pedal steel to a WVKR radio session by CIAO MALZ.

== Solo discography ==
=== Albums ===
- Practical Wireless (Absolutely Kosher Records, 2002)
- Flashes and Occultations (WIAIWYA, 2017)
- Abbey Wood (Gare Du Nord, March 2018)

=== EPs ===
- Sucky Tart (Audio Antihero, 2011)
- Dandelion Sessions – March 2011 (BarelyOut Recordings, 2011)

=== Compilations ===
- The Sisters of St. Anthony – A singles series in 12 parts (Audio Antihero, 2012–2013)

=== Singles ===
- The Anti-Santa (Fika Recordings, 2011)
- The Shackleton (Audio Antihero, 2012)
- Farewell Jezebel feat. Darren Hayman and Anthony Harding (Audio Antihero, 2012)
- Sweet JD (Audio Antihero, 2012)
- Yr Lucky Charm [Bad Ju Ju Version] (Audio Antihero, 2012)
- Yankee Dancy feat. Anthony Harding (Audio Antihero, 2012)
- King of The Shale (Audio Antihero, 2012)
- The West Beach (Audio Antihero, 2012)
- Cathy's Wedding (Audio Antihero, 2012)
- Glass Bells Charm with Woodcraft Folk (Audio Antihero, 2012)
- Charlotte Badger (Audio Antihero, 2013)
- Sisters of St. Anthony with Suzanne Rhatigan (Audio Antihero, 2013)
- Quotes (Audio Antihero, 2013)
- You & Me – EP with Benjamin Shaw, Cloud and Broken Shoulder (Audio Antihero, 2014)

=== Compilations ===
- A Very Cherry Christmas (Cherryade Records, 2006) – contributes "Bugger All To Do in Wagin"
- Bob Hope Would: A charity compilation of exclusives and otherwise with all proceeds to be split between Japan Society, Shelterbox, Red Cross, Save The Children and The Japan Earthquake and Tsunami Relief Fund. (Audio Antihero, 2011) – contributes "So Farewell Then Peter Murphy"
- Five Years: Volume One (Unwashed Territories, 2011) – contributes "I Stole The Cutty Sark (Dandelion Session)"
- Audio Antihero Presents: "Some.Alternate.Universe" for FSID: A charity compilation for The Foundation for the Study of Infant Deaths. (Audio Antihero, 2012) – contributes "It Will"
- Audio Antihero's Commercial Suicide Sampler (Audio Antihero, 2012) – contributes "I Stole The Cutty Sark"
- Do I Have to be Alright, All of the Time?' A Jason Molina Benefit Album (Jason Molina Benefit, 2012) – contributes "Just be Simple" (Songs: Ohia cover)
- The Hüsker Doo-wop EP for New York (Audio Antihero/Hear It For NY, 2012) – contributes "The West Beach (Hear it for NY session)"
- Into The Light: Volume One for Pussy Riot (Unwashed Territories, 2012) – contributes "The Shackleton (Dandelion Session)"
- Weary Engine Blues: Crossroads for Jason Molina (Graveface Records, 2013) – contributes "Just Be Simple" (Songs: Ohia cover)
- Audio Antihero Presents: "REGAL VS STEAMBOAT" for Rape Crisis (Audio Antihero, 2013) – contributes "Sweet JD (Stylocoustic Version)"
- Five Long Years (Audio Antihero, 2014) – contributes "Quotes"
- 21 Songs for John (Unwashed Territories, 2014) – contributes "Horsemeat for Dogs"
- A Girl and a Gun (WIAIWYA, 2015) – contributes "Die Another Day"
- Songs About Albums: Volume 1 (The Album Wall, 2015) – contributes "The Stranger Fair"
- Frog – Catchyalater – Single (Audio Antihero, 2016) – contributes "Catchyalater" (Jack Hayter Remix)
- BERN YR IDOLS (Bernie Sanders benefit compilation) (Audio Antihero, 2016) – contributes "The Unsent Letter" (Machine Gun Fellatio cover)
- Audio Antihero Presents: "Unpresidented Jams" for SPLC & NILC (Audio Antihero, 2017) - contributes "The New Colossus"
- A Very Cherry Christmas - Volume 12 (Cherryade Records, 2017) - contributes "The Beheading Game"
- The Desperation Club - A Cloud Tribute Compilation - (Audio Antihero, 2018) - contributes "Stomach Pit"
- Elder Statesman: Nine Long Years of Audio Antihero Records (Audio Antihero, 2019) - contributes "I Stole the Cutty Sark"
