= Will Schwartz (musician) =

- Genres: Folk, Americana, Outlaw Country
- Occupations: Musician, Writer
- Labels: Monkfish Records, Barely Out Recordings

Will Schwartz is a singer-songwriter, musician and fiction writer based in Queens, NY. He has released music with the band Uncles, under his own name, and under his alias The Male Pattern. As a short fiction writer, he is the winner of the 2017 literary fiction award from The Briar Cliff Review.

== Early musical output with Uncles and New Haircut solo EP (2010 - 2013) ==
While growing up in Westchester, NY, Schwartz began making music with Daniel Bateman as Uncles. They relocated to Queens, and the lineup would expand with the addition of Tom White and Duncan Berry, and the group would release singles on Ampeater Music, and two albums via Monkfish Records. The first album was Replacing Words with Other Words in 2010, which was followed by m4w in 2012.

After this, Bateman and White would form the band Frog, and Schwartz would issue a lone EP, New Haircut, under his own name, before focusing on writing fiction.

== Fiction writing (2013 - present) ==
Schwartz began writing short fiction, and was published through Ninth Letter and Newtown Literary. While studying for his MFA degree and teaching at the University of Illinois Urbana-Champaign, he won the 2017 Briar Cliff Review literary fiction award for his story "Scheherazade." He then published "Strange Men" with Baltimore Review the following year.

== Return to music as The Male Pattern (2026 - present) ==
In July 2026, Schwartz, now under the name, The Male Pattern, announced his debut solo album for a September release. Entitled I Was Shot in the Heart!, the release was a satirical, narrative-driven, concept album. The album was preceded by three singles, "The Television Watcher," "I'm a Soldier," and "Charlie (The Robbery)" between July and September. The latter single featured piano from former Uncles bandmate Daniel Bateman.

Non-single, "There Are Angels" was premiered on Under the Radar September 10, before the album was debuted via God Is in the TV, a day prior to the September 25 general release. The album's release was followed by radio sessions for WORT, Cumbernauld FM, and Dandelion Radio.

== Critical reception ==
Schwartz's 2026 album, I Was Shot in the Heart!, released as The Male Pattern, received 9/10 from PopMatters, 5/5 from The Alternative, 8/10 from Americana UK, 5/6 from Fokus Music, and a positive review on Organ. The pre-album single "I'm a Soldier" was WFUV's "NY Slice" for August 26, and subsequent single, "Charlie (The Robbery)," was KLOF Magazine's "Song of the Day." Tracks from the album also placed at No.1 in the Hype Machine charts. Radio stations like FM4, WVKR, KBCS, Dandelion Radio, Freies Sender Kombinat, KBOO, WXNA, WHRB, and WLUW were also supportive.

== Discography ==
=== Albums ===
- Uncles – Replacing Words with Other Words (Monkfish Records, 2010)
- Uncles – m4w (Monkfish Records, 2012)
- The Male Pattern – I Was Shot in the Heart! (Barely Out Recordings, 2026)

=== EPs ===
- Will Schwartz – New Haircut (Monkfish Records, 2013)

=== Singles ===
- Uncles – "Settler's Song" / "Where Does It Sleep" (Ampeater Music, 2010)
- The Male Pattern – "The Television Watcher" (Barley Out Recordings, 2026)
- The Male Pattern – "I'm a Soldier" (Barely Out Recordings, 2026)
- The Male Pattern – "Charlie (The Robbery)" (Barely Out Recordings, 2026)

=== Compilation Appearances ===
- Rue Defense Tape Club: GetMusic Compilation '26 (Rue Defense, 2026) - contributes "The Television Watcher"
