= Tiberius (band) =

- Genres: Indie rock, Emo, Alternative Country
- Years active: 2015–present
- Label: Audio Antihero
- Members: Brendan Wright; Kelven Polite; Pat King; Sam Blumenstiel; Colin Boyd
- Website: www.tiberiusiskindofaband.com

Tiberius is an indie rock band based in Boston, Massachusetts, originally founded as a solo project of songwriter Brendan Wright.

== History ==
=== Early Recordings and Self-Releases (2015-2024) ===
Brendan Wright began working on solo recordings under the Tiberius name in 2015, self-releasing don't let your light fade, ya little disco ball in 2016 and A Depressing Optimism in 2018.

Wright relocated from Rutland, VT to Boston, MA, and released the Lull album in 2021, which was preceded by the “Pale Ale,” “Lull” and “Furrow” singles.

With an expanding lineup, Tiberius’ Fish in a Pond mini-album followed in 2023, and included the Chanterelle (The Fungi Song),” “Fish in a Pond,” and “Clippers” singles. Fish in a Pond peaked at #184 in the North American College & Community NACC 200 chart.

=== Troubadour (2025-Present) ===
In February 2025, Tiberius released the “Sag” single before being introduced to the Audio Antihero label by Avery Friedman. Audio Antihero re-released “Sag” in July with the announcement of Troubadour, the band's label debut album. Between August and October, Tiberius released the “Felt,” “Moab,” and “Painting of a Tree” singles, which premiered on Post-Trash, Under the Radar, and The Alternative. The band toured and played live alongside these releases, in addition to recording radio sessions for WNYU, WCHC, KGNU, WVKR, WORT, WERS, and Dandelion Radio. The band were also nominated as Best Country Artist in the 2025 Boston Music Awards during this period.

The Troubadour album was released on November 14. “Sag” reached #1 in the Hype Machine “Popular Now,” “Highlights,” and “Most Posted Now” charts, and placed at #4 in the Dandelion Radio Festive Fifty chart. The album debuted in the NACC 200 at #191 on November 25, before reaching #90 in the following weeks.

== Critical reception ==
The Troubadour album received 8/10 from PopMatters, 9/10 from God Is In the TV, 5/5 from New Noise Magazine, and 8/10 from Mindies. It also received coverage from Under the Radar, NPR Music (All Songs Considered), KLOF Mag, The Alternative, Post-Trash, and Relix, as well as airplay from BBC Radio Scotland, KEXP, WVKR, WFMU, and others.

== Discography ==
=== Albums and EPs ===
- don't let your light fade, ya little disco ball (Self-Released / 2017)
- A Depressing Optimism (Self-Released / 2018)
- Lull (Self-Released / 2021)
- Fish in a Pond (Self-Released, 2023)
- Troubadour (Audio Antihero, 2025)

=== Singles ===
- Pale Ale (Self-Released, 2020)
- Furrow (Self-Released, 2020)
- Lull (Self-Released, 2020)
- Fish in a Pond (Self-Released, 2023)
- Chanterelle (The Fungi Song) (Self-Released, 2023)
- Clippers (Self-Released, 2023)
- driving off phoebe's bridge / in my 2009 honda civic (Self-Released, 2024)
- Sag (Audio Antihero, 2025)
- Felt (Audio Antihero, 2025)
- Moab (Audio Antihero, 2025)
- Painting of a Tree (Audio Antihero, 2025)

=== Compilations and live releases ===
- trial and error: a series of drafts and demos from 2015 (Self-Released / 2020)
- Moose Tracks (Vol. I): Tunes from the Pandemic (Self-Released, 2021)
- Clumps In The Grass [Live] (Self-Released, 2022)

=== Compilation appearances ===
- PLAGUE TAPE 2021 - (Boston Hassle, 2021) - contributes "Despair Came Knocking"
- Hit the North Pole (Vol.1): A Festive Charity Compilation for the Palestine Children's Relief Fund (Hit the North Records, 2024)
- Allston x Allston - (No Label, 2025) - contributes "Dry Rot" and "Hypoxia" (Writer Only)
- Rue Defense Tape Club: December 2025 (Rue Defense, 2025) - contributes "Sag"
