= Sara Mae =

- Genres: Indie, Bedroom pop
- Occupations: Musician, Writer
- Label: Audio Antihero

Sara Mae Henke is a writer, poet, singer and musician based in Philadelphia, PA. They founded the band The Noisy, and have released two poetry collections as Sara Mae.

== Early life and education ==
Sara Mae was raised on Chesapeake Bay, before relocating to Boston, and later Knoxville, where they received their MFA from the University of Tennessee. In 2021, they were a Sewanee Writers' Conference Scholar, received a Graduate Creative Writing Award in 2022, and were also a Big Ears Music Festival Artist Scholar in 2023.

== Writing (2016 - present) ==
While living in Boston in 2016, Sara Mae began writing for Boston Hassle, in addition to performing poetry locally, and winning a Boston Poetry Slam in 2017. They published their debut poetry collection, Priestess of Tankinis through Game Over Books in 2018.

In 2023, they were a finalist in the Just Buffalo Literary Center Poetry Fellowship, their poetry was featured in Phoenix Magazine's "Issue 65" publication and exhibit, and their second collection, Phantasmagossip, won that year's Vinyl45 chapbook competition. Phantasmagossip was then published via YesYes Books in March 2025, and Sara Mae accompanied the release with a reading a tour.

On October 31, 2025, Sara Mae published an excerpt from their upcoming Lawn Madonna novella on The Alternative.

Sara Mae has also contributed poetry, fiction, and reviews to numerous music and literary publications, including The Georgia Review, Poetry Foundation, FENCE, The Adroit Journal, and American Literary Review.

== The Noisy (2019 - present) ==
=== Early releases and debut album (2019 - 2024) ===
Sara Mae began writing and self-releasing music as The Noisy in 2019 with Day Night Dress, which was followed by the Charm Bracelet EP in 2021. In 2022, they released the Junie B Jones & The Strawberry Moons, a collection of demos from a "Song-a-Day" project, and recorded a radio session for WDVX.

Sara Mae evolved the project into a band lineup, and in 2023, The Noisy released the “Morricone” single, and crowd-funded the recording of their debut album The Secret Ingredient Is More Meat, before relocating to Philadelphia.

The album was preceded by the “Ballerino” and “Backlit” singles before its self-release on May 24, 2024. The release was followed by a video for “Violet Lozenge.”

=== The Secret Ingredient Is Even More Meat and new material (2025 - present) ===
In 2025, the band signed with the Audio Antihero label to issue a deluxe edition of the debut album, entitled ‘The Secret Ingredient Is Even More Meat,’ which featured new and unreleased material, as well as radio session for WVKR.

The “Twos” single was issued in June, and was followed by “Grenadine,” “Nightshade,” and “Neckline (Deluxe Version)” before the deluxe album's release on October 24, 2025, with a video for “Tony Soprano (Deluxe)” premiering on KLOF Mag the day prior.

=== Critical reception ===
The original and reissued ...More Meat album album received positive coverage and support from Under the Radar Magazine, KLOF Mag, Jenesaispop, WXPN, Rockdelux, God Is In the TV, Spectrum Culture, Muso's Guide, Post-Trash, The Alternative, and other outlets.

The “Grenadine” single reached No.3 in the Hype Machine “Most Posted” chart, and “Twos” reached No.1 in the “Popular Now” and “Highlights” charts.

The releases received airplay from BBC Radio Scotland, WSUM, Dandelion Radio, WNYU, WMFO, CJSW, and KXLU, as well as the band recording sessions for KGNU, WORT, Y-Not Radio, and WVKR.

== Personal life ==
Henke is non-binary and uses they/them pronouns.

== Discography ==
=== Albums ===
- The Secret Ingredient Is More Meat (Self-Released, 2024)
- The Secret Ingredient Is Even More Meat (Audio Antihero, 2025)

=== EPs ===
- Day Night Dress (Self-Released, 2019)
- Charm Bracelet (Self-Released, 2021)

=== Demos ===
- Junie B Jones & The Strawberry Moons (Self-Released, 2022)

=== Singles ===
- "Morricone" (Self-Released, 2023)
- "Ballerino" (Self-Released, 2024)
- "Backlit" (Self-Released, 2024)
- "Twos" (Audio Antihero, 2025)
- "Grenadine" (Audio Antihero, 2025)
- Nightshade (Audio Antihero, 2025)
- "Neckline (Deluxe)" (Audio Antihero, 2025)

=== Compilation appearances ===
- Artists United Against Genocide Vol.1 (Artists United Against Genocide, 2025) - contributes "Everybody Wants to Be My Moon"

== Bibliography ==
=== Poetry ===
- Priestess of Tankinis (Game Over Books, 2018)
- Phantasmagossip (YesYes Books, 2025)
