= Avery Friedman =

American musician

- Genres: Indie, indie folk
- Occupation: Musician
- Label: Audio Antihero

Avery Friedman is a Brooklyn-based musician and singer-songwriter from Cleveland, Ohio. She released her debut album, New Thing, in April 2025.

== Music career ==
=== Debut and Early Releases (2023-2024) ===
Friedman first began writing and performing songs in 2023.

Her first demo recordings in 2024 were included in two benefit compilations from Steakhouse Records (You're Gonna Be Great 3 - A Compilation in Support of the Entertainment Community Fund) and GUNK (For Palestine).

Friedman recorded her debut album in the winter of 2024 with James Chrisman, Felix Walworth, Ryan Cox, and Malia DelaCruz. In November Friedman self-released the “Flowers Fell” single.

=== Debut Album and New Material (2025-present) ===
In January 2025, the Audio Antihero label reissued the "Flowers Fell" single, and Friedman's debut album, New Thing was announced for release on April 18. Following this announcement, Friedman released the “Photo Booth” single on February 28.

The album's final single, "New Thing", was released on March 28, after premiering with Under the Radar the day prior.

New Thing was released via Audio Antihero on April 18. After the debut album's release, Friedman opened for Speedy Ortiz at Defector Media's 5th birthday event, supported Mt. Joy at an event for WFUV, and recorded an "Alive in the Basement" session with Leilani Patao for WNYU.

In September 2025, Friedman contributed a demo of a new song, "Underbelly," to the Merciless Accelerating Rhythms: Artists United for a Free Palestine benefit compilation for the Palestine Children's Relief Fund.

In October 2026. Friedman announced her first international tour dates and "You Move," a new single via Audio Antihero, which was premiered on Flood Magazine on October 8. On October 9, the single received its general release, and she also guested on SubwayTakes.

In October and November, Friedman played a series of shows in Amsterdam, the UK, and Germany. The tour included the Simple Things and London Calling festivals, in addition to a session for Resonance FM.

=== Critical reception ===
The New Thing album received a positive response from the following outlets: NPR Music's All Songs Considered, KLOF Magazine, No Depression, The Line of Best Fit, Rockerilla, Out Front Magazine, Mindies, God Is In The TV, The Alternative, Post-Trash, and New Noise Magazine, and others. The album was also praised by Hanif Abdurraqib, who later included it in his Albums of the Year list. In January 2026, No Depression included Friedman in their "QUEER COUNTRY: The Best Queer Roots Music of 2025" list.

Radio support New Thing included BBC Radio Scotland, FM4, WFUV, WKDU, WNYU, WRBB, KXLU, WMBR, WVKR, and others.

== Discography ==
=== Albums ===
- New Thing (Audio Antihero, 2025)

=== Singles ===
- "Flowers Fell" (Self-Release, 2024 / Audio Antihero, 2025)
- "Photo Booth" (Audio Antihero, 2025)
- "New Thing" (Audio Antihero, 2025)
- "You Move" (Audio Antihero, 2026)

=== Compilation appearances ===
- You're Gonna Be Great 3 - A Compilation in Support of the Entertainment Community Fund (Steakhouse Records, 2023) - contributing "Familiar (Demo)”
- For Palestine (GUNK, 2023) - contributing "Somewhere to Go (Voice Memo)"
- Hope Fields (Indiemono, 2025) - contributing "Photo Booth"
- Artists United for a Free Palestine - Vol II (Merciless Accelerating Rhythms, 2025) - contributing "Underbelly (Demo)"
