= Extradition Order (band) =

- Origin: England
- Genres: Post punk outsider music
- Years active: 2007–
- Label: I blame the parents/hlp19
- Members: Radhika Aggarwal; Matthew Bergin; Nicholas Boardman; Alastair Harper; Jeremy Walton
- Past members: Mark Davies
- Website: http://www.extraditionorder.co.uk/

Extradition Order are a British band from Warrington, England, now based in London.

The band were originally made up of school friends from the North West of England; lyricist and guitarist Alastair Harper, keyboardist Matthew Bergin, bassist Nicholas Boardman and drummer Mark Davies. Mark Davies left for Colombia in 2009 and long-term drum lender and friend Radhika Aggarwal took the drum seat. Subsequently, long-time Paul Hawkins collaborator Jeremy Walton joined after a string of substitute appearances resulted in his formal ascension into the band's ranks.

Having previously released several homemade EPs, their debut single "Penetrate" came out on I blame the parents, on 8 June 2008. Their debut album Since The Bomb Dropped was released 28 September 2009. Both single and album were produced by Ian Button.

They released their eight-track double EP "Our Thoughts on Failure" and "Our Thoughts on Revenge" on limited edition 12-inch vinyl and download in June 2012 on hlp19. On 17 June 2012, The Sunday Times named single "Canoe" Hottest Download of the week.

They have played with Jeffrey Lewis, Darwin Deez, Paul Hawkins & The Awkward Silences, David Cronenberg's Wife and Benjamin Shaw.

The band are currently preparing for the release of their second album; a concept album focused on the Kennedy dynasty. Their musical output is complemented by a series of music videos, both self-produced and filmed by others, that are available on popular video-hosting sites.

== Releases ==
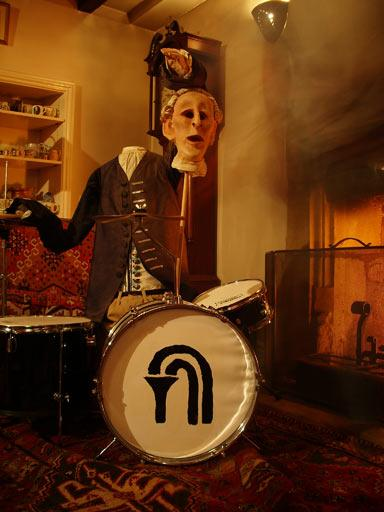
Free publicity shot of Extradition Order

=== Albums ===
- Since The Bomb Dropped (28 September 2009)

=== EPs ===
- Te Irrumabo EP
- Our Thoughts on Failure / Our Thoughts on Revenge (June 2012, double EP)

=== Singles ===
- "Penetrate" / "Warrington" (8 June 2008)
- "Laura In The Water" / "House Carpenter"
- "Bob Hope would": A compilation of exclusives and otherwise for the Japan Relief Effort (Audio Antihero, March 2011)
- "Canoe" / "Hate" (4 June 2012)
