= Suzanne Rhatigan =

Irish singer, songwriter, and musician (born 1963)

- Born: 1963 (age 62–63); Dublin, Ireland
- Occupations: Singer; songwriter
- Label: Stock, Aitken and Waterman
- Member of: Rhatigan
- Website: suzannerhatigan.com

Suzanne Rhatigan (born 1963) is an Irish singer, songwriter, and musician.

== Career ==
Born and raised in Dublin where she learned to sing and play the guitar, Rhatigan began her career as a teenager playing with several Irish bands before moving to London in the early 1980s. During that period, she found steady work as a session singer with Stock, Aitken and Waterman Records, learned the piano, and began working on her own material. As 'Kerri Wells' she sang in the United Kingdom in the Eurovision Song Contest 1985, placing 7th.

In 1990, she began dating Craig Charles and had a guest appearance alongside him in a Series Four episode of the sci-fi TV series Red Dwarf (Series 4, Episode 1: "Camille") which was first broadcast in February 1991.

=== Solo album ===
Later in 1991, she signed a contract with Imago records to record a solo album. Entitled To Hell With Love, the album consisted of twelve tracks, mostly written by Rhatigan and Charles with some contribution from other writers. The album was produced by Fred Maher, who also played percussion, and the backing band included Matthew Sweet (bass), Robert Quine (guitar), Bernie Worrell (keyboards), Matt Backer (guitar), and Drew Vogelman (drums), among others. The title track was released as a single, complete with music video, early in 1992 and Rhatigan performed it live on an episode of Later... With Jools Holland. The full album was released later that year, followed by a second single, Open Up. In 1993 a third single Indian Summer was released, but Imago records ceased trading shortly afterwards, stalling her career. Her relationship with Charles ended soon after.

=== Rhatigan ===
She re-emerged in 1995 as the lead singer and guitarist of the punk pop trio Rhatigan, alongside John Morrison (who also played in Hefner) on bass guitar and Brynn Burrows (later replaced by Paul Murphy) on drums. The band had a four-year residency at London's 12 Bar Club on Denmark Street, and Suzanne Rhatigan's night attracted many small bands early in their development, such as Kings of Convenience, the Clientele, Hefner, and Turin Brakes. In 1996, the band released a twelve track album entitled Late Developer. In 1998, the band recorded a seven track mini-album entitled Big Stick which had no commercial release and was sold directly to fans at performances.

In 2012, their song Me was covered by former collaborator Antony Harding for the Audio Antihero charity album "Some.Alternate.Universe. for FSID".

==== Albums ====
- Late Developer (1996) Org
- Big Stick mini-album (1998) Cushy Productions

==== Singles, EPs ====
- Split EP with Pura Vida (1996) Org
- "Happy" (1996) Org
- DIY CD EP (1999) Cushy Productions

=== 2010s ===
In early 2013, Suzanne guested on the "Sisters of St. Anthony" single by Jack Hayter (ex-Hefner), released on Audio Antihero. To mark her 50th birthday Suzanne started her 50 Greatest Misses Blog uploading songs and stories of her adventures and misadventures in the music industry. Between 2012 and 2014, she uploaded much of her previously released work to music sharing site bandcamp.

== Solo discography ==
- "To Hell With Love" Imago (1992, MC single)
- "Open Up" Imago (1992, CD single) ("Open Up"/"Daddy"/"Finally Come Around")
- To Hell With Love Imago (1992, CD album)
- "Indian Summer" Imago (1993, CD single) ("Indian Summer" (Radio Edit)/"Learning to Cry"/"Crosstown Traffic" (J.Hendrix) (2 meter session))
- "Sisters of St. Anthony" with Jack Hayter Audio Antihero (2013, Digital Single)
- "Before and After* Bandcamp (2013 CD single) (2 track Christmas Single) ("Time To Put Things Right"/"Spinner Of Years Acoustic Version")

== Bibliography ==
- Newman, Melinda; Morris, Chris; Morris, Edward (6 June 1992). "Album Reviews – To Hell with Love by Suzanne Rhatigan". Billboard. Vol. 104, no. 23. p. 45. "...compelling debut with wide ranging release..."
- Pareles, Jon (15 July 1992). "Reviews/Rock; Singer Working The Territory Of Irish Soul". The New York Times. p. C14. Reviews a performance by Rhatigan in New York City at Tilt.
- "Quick Fixes—To Hell with Love by Suzanne Rhatigan". Stereo Review. Vol. 57, no. 9. September 1992. p. 86.
