= Nothing to Wish For (Nothing to Lose) =

Studio album by Air Formation
- Released: 1 March 2010
- Recorded: September–October 2009 at Perry Vale Studios in London
- Genre: Shoegazing, dream pop
- Length: 52:09
- Label: Club AC30
- Producer: Pat Collier

Air Formation chronology
Daylight Storms (2010)	Nothing to Wish For (Nothing to Lose) (2010)

Nothing to Wish For (Nothing to Lose) is the fourth album by the English shoegazing band Air Formation. It was released on the label Club AC30 on March 1, 2010.

== Track listing ==
1. "Three Years Pass" – 5:53
2. "Stars and Knives" – 4:01
3. "Low December Sun" – 3:09
4. "Alone at Last" – 5:54
5. "Don't Wait 'Til Dawn" – 5:23
6. "Meltdown" – 3:14
7. "Until Today" – 5:10
8. "Like I Hold You" – 4:36
9. "Cut Through the Night" – 4:40
10. "Outro" – 4:38
11. "Distant Silhouettes" - 5:35

== Personnel ==
- Matt Bartram – guitar, six string bass, vocals
- Ben Pierce – bass
- Richard Parks – keyboards
- James Harrison – drums
- Ian Sheridan – guitar, feedback
