= Bush Radio =

Bush Radio may refer to:

- Bush Radio (South Africa), a Cape Town radio station
- Bush Radio, a defunct British manufacturer of radio sets, its name surviving in the Bush brand of consumer electronic products
