= The Drink =

England's Pop Band

- Origin: London
- Genres: dark folk, pop
- Years active: 2012-
- Label: Melodic Records
- Members: Dearbhla Minogue; David Stewart; Daniel Fordham

The Drink is an English odd dark folk pop band based in London, England. Made up of Dearbhla Minogue, David Stewart and Daniel Fordham, they formed in late 2011 when Dearbhla recruited Daniel and David after their former band Fighting Kites split as she had got to know them whilst living above their rehearsal space. Their first record, Company, was released in 2014. The group's second album Capital was released in November 2015. The album received praise from The Guardian and The Line of Best Fit and was supported with session for Marc Riley on BBC Radio 6 Music.

The Drink have performed with groups like Frog, Field Music, Darren Hayman and the Long Parliament, and The Wave Pictures, in addition to playing festival slots for events like End of the Road Festival and Green Man Festival.

== Discography ==
=== Albums ===
- Company, released 1 December 2014
- Capital, released 13 November 2015
