= The Briar Cliff Review =

- Discipline: Literary journal
- Language: English
- Edited by: Tricia Currans-Sheehan

Publication details
- History: 1989-present
- Publisher: Briar Cliff University (United States)
- Frequency: Annual

Standard abbreviations
- ISO 4: Briar Cliff Rev.

Indexing
- ISSN: 1550-0926

Links
- Journal homepage

The Briar Cliff Review is a literary journal based in Sioux City, Iowa, USA, home of Briar Cliff University. The Review was founded in 1989 and has awarded its well-renowned prizes in fiction and poetry since 1996. The current editors are Tricia Currans-Sheehan, Rich Yates (design), Jeanne Emmons (Poetry), Jeff Gard / Amelia Skinner Saint (Fiction), Jeff Baldus (Art), and Paul Weber / Ryan Allen (Nonfiction).

The final issue of the Briar Cliff Review is to be Volume 35 (2023).

Previous winners of the Briar Cliff Review fiction prize include Jacob M. Appel's "The Final Word in Bee Keeping" (2000), George V. Tucker's "Norman, Oklahoma" (2003), Rebecca Tuch's "Stop Saying My Name" (2006), Scott H. Andrews's "A Brief Swell of Twilight" (2007), and Will Schwartz's "Scheherazade" (2017).

Winning poets include Elizabeth Volpe (2004), Deborah DeNicola (2007), and Sarah Sousa (2011)

Jenna Blum's short story Those Who Save Us first appeared in the 14th issue of The Briar Cliff Review (2002).

Siobhan Fallon won the 2010 fiction prize for her short story "Burning." She later included the story in her first book You Know When the Men Are Gone.

== Awards ==
- 2002 Gold Crown Award
- 2000 Pacemaker Award
- 1999 Gold Crown Award
- 1998 Gold Crown Award
- 1997 Silver Crown Award
- 1995 Pacemaker Award
- 1994 Gold Crown Award
- 1993 Gold Crown Award
- 1992 Silver Crown Award

== See also ==
- List of literary magazines
