= Nosferatu D2 =

English indie rock band

- Origin: Croydon, London, England
- Genres: Indie rock, Lo-Fi, Alternative
- Years active: 2005–2007
- Label: Audio Antihero
- Past members: Ben Parker; Adam Parker
- Website: www.nosferatud2.bandcamp.com

Nosferatu D2 were an English indie rock band formed by brothers Ben and Adam Parker in Croydon, Surrey, England in 2005, after their previous band, Tempertwig, disbanded. They recorded an album but it was never released and they disbanded in 2007. Ben Parker began a solo project under the name Superman Revenge Squad.

Nosferatu D2's recordings were released as an album in 2009, and in 2015 a recording of their last live show was released. In 2019, Tempertwig's works were re-released. The brothers would come back together as The Superman Revenge Squad Band, and finally perform under the name My Best Unbeaten Brother.

== History ==
=== Tempertwig (1999–2004) ===
Brothers, Ben (guitar/vocals) and Adam Parker (drums) originally made music together in a trio called Tempertwig, along with bassist Daniel Debono. They performed live in London and released several demos and a self-released 7" single split with Air Formation.

=== Nosferatu D2 (2005–2007) ===
After Tempertwig, Ben and Adam Parker formed Nosferatu D2 and began to play shows and release demos new material.

During the band's lifespan, they played a show with Air Formation and opened for Los Campesinos! and Sky Larkin at The Spitz.

In 2007, Ben Parker began writing and recording under the Superman Revenge Squad name, and Nosferatu D2 disbanded.

=== Nosferatu D2 Album release (2009) ===
In 2009, Nosferatu D2's unreleased We're Gonna Walk Around This City With Our Headphones On To Block Out The Noise album was issued by the debuting Audio Antihero record label. The album received positive reviews from Drowned In Sound, The 405, This Is Fake DIY, The Music Fix, The Organ, The Skinny, and The Line Of Best Fit Gareth David Paisey of Los Campesinos! included the album in his Best of 2009 list for Pitchfork.

The album subsequently became the subject of radio features for BBC Introducing; WVUM, and BBC World Service/PRI's "The World".

=== Additional Nosferatu D2 releases ===
The band has contributed additional unreleased recordings to charity compilations.

In September 2012, the band re-issued remastered recordings of their final show as Live At The Spitz through Audio Antihero.

In 2015, Audio Antihero released an EP of non-album recordings entitled Older, Wiser, Sadder."

=== Further Parker brother projects (2013-present) ===
Post-Nosferatu D2, Ben and Adam Parker collaborated on the There is Nothing More Frightening Than the Passing of Time album by The Superman Revenge Squad Band.

In March 2019, Audio Antihero issued Fake Nostalgia: An Anthology of Broken Stuff release by Tempertwig. The compilation album was followed with the Films Without Plotlines EP which contained their remaining unreleased recordings.

In 2023, Ben and Adam Parker announced their participation in a new group called My Best Unbeaten Brother. In May of that year, they self-released "The Practice Room Recordings" before contributing a new song to Joyzine's "20 Years of Joy Vol. 2" compilation, which was later released as a single.

My Best Unbeaten Brother announced their debut mini-album 'Pessimistic Pizza' for a 28 June release via Audio Antihero. The group also recorded a radio session for Mark Whitby's June Dandelion Radio show.

== Discography ==
=== Albums and EPs ===
- We're Gonna Walk Around This City With Our Headphones On to Block Out the Noise (Audio Antihero, 2009)
- Older, Wiser, Sadder – EP (Audio Antihero, 2015)

=== Live albums ===
- Live at the Spitz (05/03/2007) (Audio Antihero, 2012)

=== Compilation appearances ===
- Bob Hope Would|Bob Hope Would – for Japan (Audio Antihero, 2011) – contributes "The Kids From FAME" / "Older, Wiser, Sadder" / "A Man at War With Himself"
- Christmas In Haworth: An Advent Calendar from Darren Hayman, Fika Recordings and Friends (Fika Recordings, 2011) - contributes "It's Christmas Time (For God's Sake)"
- Some.Alternate.Universe – for FSID (Audio Antihero, 2012) – contributes "A Footnote" (Demo)
- Audio Antihero's Commercial Suicide Sampler (Audio Antihero, 2012) – contributes "Springsteen"
- The Hüsker Doo-wop EP for New York (Audio Antihero/Hear It For NY, 2012) – contributes "Older, Wiser, Sadder"
- Into the Light: Volume Three for Pussy Riot (Unwashed Territories, 2012) – contributes "It's Christmas Time (For God's Sake)"
- Five Long Years (Audio Antihero, 2014) - contributes "Broken Tamagotchi"
- Elder Statesman: Nine Long Years of Audio Antihero Records (Audio Antihero, 2019) – contributes "Springsteen"
