= Air Formation =

English indie rock band

- Origin: Sussex, South East, England
- Genres: Shoegazing, dream pop, space rock, indie rock
- Years active: 1998–2011 2014 - Present
- Labels: Drive-in Records, Clairecords, Club AC30, Distant Noise
- Members: Matt Bartram; Ben Pierce; Richard Parks; James Harrison; Ian Sheridan
- Website: Air Formation

Air Formation are an English indie rock band, that debuted with their first 7" in the summer of 1998 under the name "b.e.a.b Approved". In early 2000 they were forced to change their name and chose Air Formation. Inspired by Flying Saucer Attack, Spacemen 3, and The Jesus and Mary Chain, their music incorporated heavily delayed guitar and feedback, droning keyboards, and soft vocals. They have released six albums, three EPs, and five 7" singles.

== Career ==
Air Formation released their fourth album Nothing to Wish For (Nothing to Lose), in March 2010. They parted ways in April 2011 before reforming in 2014.

During Air Formation's downtime Matt Bartram and James Harrison formed "You Walk Through Walls", and released an album and an EP via Club AC30.

In their career they have played with artists like Nosferatu D2, Vessels, Chapterhouse and Efterklang.

In early 2014 it was revealed that Air Formation would be returning for a special show to celebrate 10 years of Club AC30. They followed this in September 2015 with a new 4 track EP 'Were We Ever Here', their first new music in 5 years. In July 2017 the band announced that their 5th studio album was finished and would be released on Club AC30 "in early 2018". They also announced a gig at The Prince Albert in Brighton in September 2017 - their first live performance in 2 years. In March 2018 Air Formation released their fifth album ‘Near Miss’ on Club AC30 Records. Air Formation announced the release of a new Self Titled album with the release of single 'Finding Gravity' on 19th February 2024. 'Air Formation' was released on 19th April 2024.

== Members ==
- Matt Bartram – vocals, guitar
- Ben Pierce – bass
- Richard Parks – keyboards
- James Harrison – drums
- Ian Sheridan – guitar

== Discography ==
Studio albums

- Ends in Light (2002)
- Stay Inside/Feel Everything (2004)
- Daylight Storms (2007)
- Nothing to Wish For (Nothing to Lose) (2010)
- Near Miss (2018)
- Air Formation (2024)

Singles and EPs

- "Air Formation EP" (October 2000)
- "Seethrustars" (October 2003)
- "57 Octaves Below EP" (May 2005)
- "It's Over Now/Formation 2" (October 2007)
- "Things That Don't Exist/Fires" (November 2008)
- "Low December Sun/Silence Outside"(February 2010)
- "Were We Ever Here EP" (September 2015)
