= Stuart Evers =

British writer (born 1976)

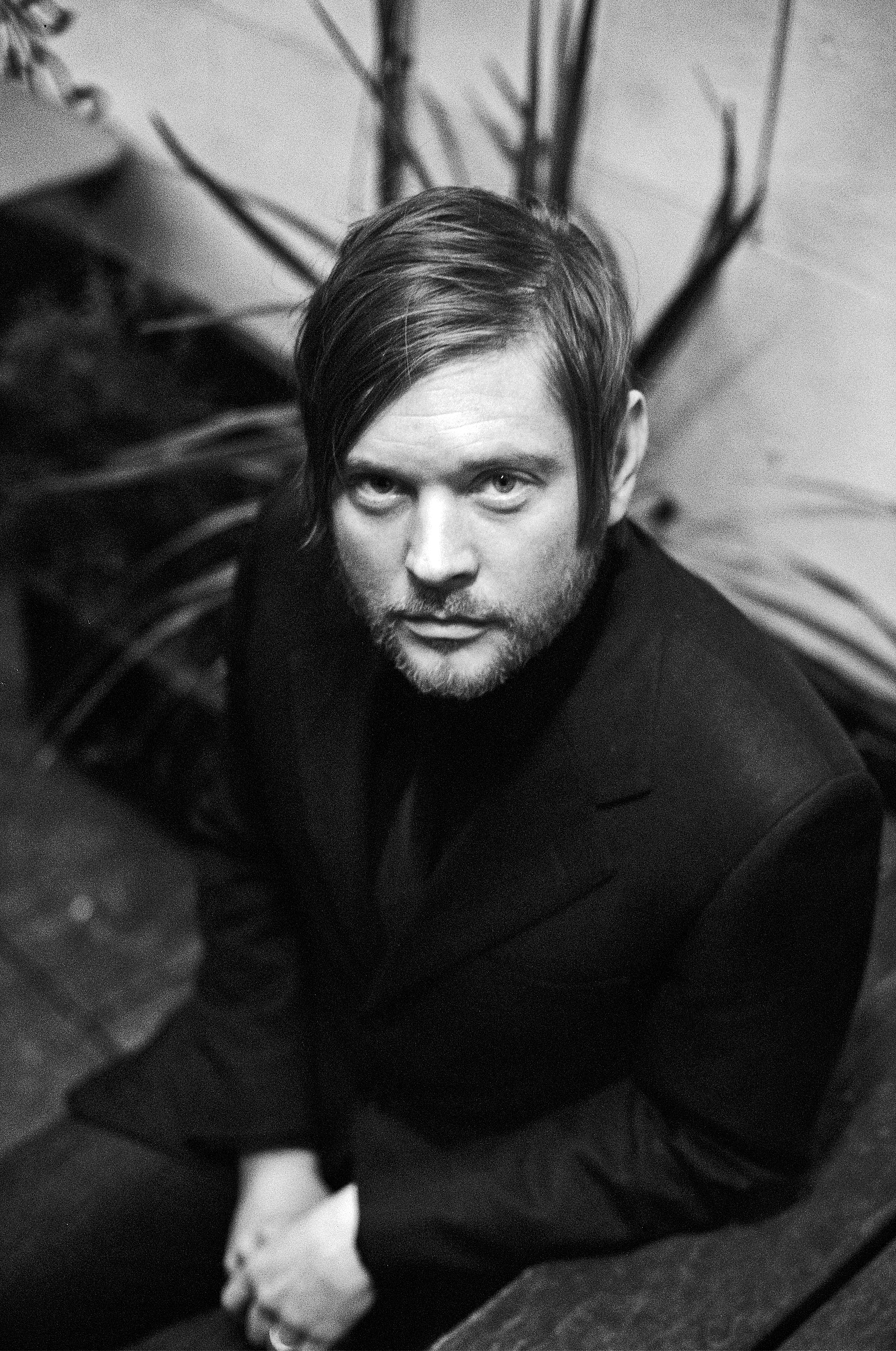
Stuart Evers in 2015

Stuart Evers is a British novelist, short story writer and critic, born in Macclesfield, Cheshire in 1976. He was brought up in Congleton, Cheshire.

In late 2017, Evers was announced as the joint winner of the 2018 Eccles British Library Writer's Award - one of Europe's richest prizes for a work in progress.

== Fiction ==
His short fiction has appeared in Prospect (Underground), and on Granta (This is Not a Test), The Sunday Times (What's in Swindon?) and The White Review (Somnoproxy) online, as well as in three editions of The Best British Short Stories. His story Our Italics was read by Anton Lesser on Radio 4 in 2016. He has also contributed to two Comma Press anthologies - Beta Life and Protest - and Eight Ghosts, a collection of ghost stories commissioned by English Heritage.

=== Ten Stories About Smoking ===
Evers published his first book, Ten Stories About Smoking, (Picador) in 2011, which won The London Book Award.

=== If This Is Home ===
His debut novel, If This Is Home , appeared in July 2012. The novel is set in Cheshire and Las Vegas.

=== Your Father Sends His Love ===
A further collection of stories, Your Father Sends His Love was published in 2015 and was shortlisted for the 2016 Edge Hill Short Story Prize.

=== The Blind Light ===
Published in 2020, The Blind Light was Evers' first novel for eight years. The Blind Light "moves from the Fifties through to the present day, taking in the global and local events that will shape and define them all. From the Cuban Missile Crisis to the War on Terror, from the Dagenham strikes to Foot and Mouth, from Skiffle to Rave, we see a family come together, driven apart, fracture and reform – as the pressure of the past is brought, sometimes violently, to bear on the present." The Blind Light was shortlisted for the RSL Encore Award in 2021.

== Journalism ==
Evers reviews books regularly for a variety of publications, including The Guardian, The Independent, New Statesman, The Spectator and The Observer. His essay on Sherwood Anderson appeared in Morphologies and he has written long pieces on James Salter and David Peace for The Quietus.

== Music ==
In 2015, Evers collaborated with the band Daughter, using his three short stories, Dress, Windows, and 5,040, as basis for the music videos of songs "Doing the Right Thing", "Numbers", and "How" respectively. These videos were released ahead of the English band's release of their second album Not to Disappear in 2016. All three stories used in this collaboration included no dialogue in accordance with the inability of a music video to express dialogue. He has also read with musical accompaniment from Fighting Kites.
