= The French (band) =

The French are a British Electronic band, formed by Darren Hayman and John Morrison after the band Hefner declared an indefinite hiatus. The pair continued to use vintage drum machines and synthesizers, a choice that was present on Hefner's last recordings.

The French released one album, Local Information, on Too Pure in 2003, which received a five star review in The Guardian, four stars from RTE, four stars from AllMusic, and a positive NME review, among others. The songs "Porn Shoes" and "Gabriel in the Airport" both appeared in the John Peel BBC Radio 1 Festive Fifty at #27 and #36 respectively. The band also recorded two Maida Vale sessions between 2003 and 2004. After which Hayman was involved in a legal dispute with Too Pure before launching his solo career.

Hayman has stated that he "spunked his career up the wall spectacularly" by following Hefner with The French, adding in 2026 that "when I make an electronic record, I have to expect a smaller reaction." Hayman considers it one of his best albums.

In 2011, Allo Darlin' covered the song "The Wu-Tang Clan," and released it on the Darren EP, which featured a song about Hayman.

In 2009, Mojo Magazine featured Local Information as the September issue's "Hidden Gem." In 2018, Electronic Sound Magazine also featured it as a "Buried Treasure," stating "All Darren Hayman’s albums are good, but in my view, there’s none better than Local Information."

Like Hefner, the French are now on an indefinite hiatus, but in interviews for The J-Card Podcast and God Is In the TV in May 2026, Hayman suggested unreleased material by The French could be released before the end of the year.

On September 18 2026, The French issued the TV Themes EP via Audio Antihero. The EP is a collection of covers of television theme songs (The Littlest Hobo, Miami Vice, Big John, Little John and Hill Street Blues), a re-recording of the 2004 session for John Peel.

== Discography ==
=== Albums ===
- Local Information (2003, Too Pure)

=== Singles and EPs ===
- "Dagenham EP" (2003, Too Pure)
- "Porn Shoes / Gabriel in the Airport" (2003, Too Pure)
- "TV Themes" (2026, Audio Antihero)

=== Compilation Appearances ===
- Vital Music - Chain With No Name (2003, Vital) – contributes "Porn Shoes"
- Too Pure Records 2003/2004 (2004, Too Pure) – contributes "Porn Shoes" and "Gabriel in the Airport"
- Songs to Break God's Heart (2005, Acuarela Discos) – contributes "Watery For..."
- snö (2023, Where It's at Is Where You Are) – contributes "Snaa"
