= Company (The Drink album) =

Studio album by The Drink
- Released: December 1, 2014
- Genre: Odd dark folk pop

Professional ratings
Review scores
Source	Rating
Drowned in Sound	7/10
The Irish Times	3/5 stars
The Line of Best Fit	7/10 stars
Loud and Quiet	5/10
musicOMH	3/5 stars
NME	7/10

Company is the first studio album by The Drink released on 1 December 2014.

== Track listing ==
Company track listing
No.	Title	Length
1.	"Microsleep"	2:56
2.	"Bantamweight"	4:05
3.	"Playground"	4:40
4.	"Dead Ringers"	3:37
5.	"Fever"	3:42
6.	"Wicklow"	4:06
7.	"At The Weekend"	3:20
8.	"Beasts Are Sleeping"	3:46
9.	"Demo Love"	2:47
10.	"Desert"	2:36
11.	"Junkyard"	3:08
12.	"Haunted Place"	3:34
