= Ten Stories About Smoking =

Short story collection related to smoking

First edition (publ. Picador)

Ten Stories About Smoking is the debut short story collection by writer Stuart Evers.
