= Alex Templeton-Ward =

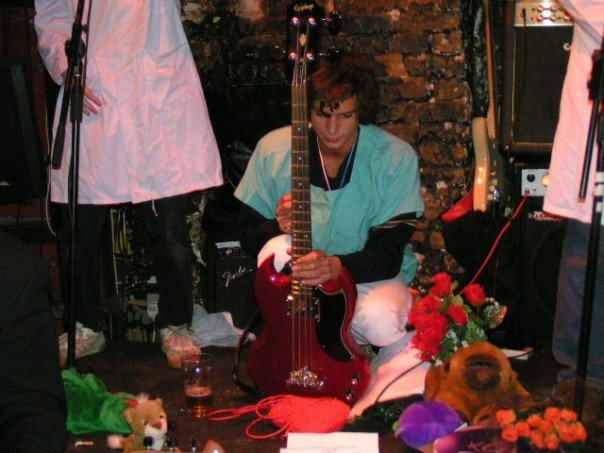

Background information
- Born: Carlisle, Cumbria
- Genres: Experimental rock, avant-garde, psychedelic rock, outsider, anti-folk
- Occupations: Founder, creative director, artist, writer, crypto-artist, business owner
- Instruments: Vocals, guitar, bass, synthesizer
- Label: Jezus Factory Records

Alex Templeton-Ward is an English artist and musician. He is a founding member of The Beat Maras and Black Coral Groove and a one time member of Paul Hawkins & Thee Awkward Silences; where he provided vocals, bass, sampling, synthesizers and has writing credits. His art work relies heavily on digital software and includes animation, 3D and digital painting. The artist originally comes from Cumbria in Northern England.

== Life and career ==
=== Osuvox Ltd. ===
In early 2021 Templeton-Ward founded Osuvox Ltd., a metaverse company focussing on augmented and virtual reality implementations for Web 3.0. The company launched with 10k avatars minted on the Ethereum blockchain. 100 of the 10k avatars are titled 'Legendary' and are based on Templeton-Ward's writings. The company has stated it intends on building the 'Osuvox Metaverse' where avatar owners will have access to exclusive content in an open world Unity game.

=== Music ===
The Beat Maras released The Huaraz EP on 14 April 2008, through Jezus Factory Records. Room Thirteen said the EP "Sounds like Morrissey and Elvis Costello jamming at Elliott Smith's wake". Both these releases were produced by Ian Button.

Templeton-Ward's work with Paul Hawkins saw him contribute towards six singles and two albums. Templeton-Ward's poetry has been performed in support of members from bands such as Ian Dury and the Noisettes. Templeton-Ward has appeared on radio numerous times including a BBC Radio 1 live session with Huw Stephens and multiple appearances on BBC Radio 6.

Templeton-Ward began a new band, Black Coral Groove, in 2013. The songs are co-written with Ruari Meehan, the pair met on a European tour supporting Kasabian. All their music has been produced by Ian Button and the band, they are expected to begin a live tour in 2015.

=== Journalism and film ===
Templeton-Ward's films have featured artists such as Miles Kane, Saul Williams, The Big Pink, Spector, Dark Dark Dark, Man Like Me, Hurts, Akron/Family, Babeshadow, Emmy The Great, Listener, Jeffrey Lewis, Rival Sons, British Sea Power, Metronomy, Death in Vegas, The Ruby Suns, Dry The River, PURE LOVE and Themselves.

Templeton-Ward has interviewed many musical artists including Sunn O))), Beirut, E.M.A., Nosaj Thing, James P Honey, CREEP, Yoni Wolf, Band of Skulls and CSS.

=== Fine art ===
As a practising fine artist Templeton-Ward's work involves multi-media, and the appliance of computer software to create imaginative landscapes. The artist's painting focusses on the relationship between alchemy, M-Theory and Jungian archetypes. His work has featured as part of the Seventeen collections.

Templeton-Ward has created an imaginary world called the 'Osuvox' and based many artworks on the theme of this realm. The world's history follows a talented scientist who freezes his head in the hope of future resurrection. Dr Badge – as he is named – eventually recovers consciousness in the 88th giga-year. Greeting him upon re-animation is an unexpected character – a 600-foot tall, pipe-smoking cat – the Singularity or Infinite Cat. After a brief introduction, the creature dramatically plots its life history beginning with prehistoric metallurgists and the dawn of shamanism/magic. It passes through the lives of alchemists Hermes Trismegistus, Moses and Jambres, various psychopomps, John Dee, Giordano Bruno and others, before addressing Jungian ideas of the archetype and the Swiss correspondence with mystical physicist Wolfgang Pauli. The history of this world feeds into the game created by the metaverse company Osuvox, which Templeton-Ward founded in 2021.

The central theme to Templeton-Ward's work is the homogeneity between what the artist believes are the realities of the collective unconscious and the unresolved problem of how (or if) wave function collapse occurs. The paintings allow parallel ideas and innumerable characters to get involved in the plot, expanding new spectrums to the allegory. These extra characters include Charles Bonnet's father, Will-o'-the-wisp, perceptual parapsychologist and ESP fanatic Karl Zener, Nicole Aubrey, Holinshed's witch and others, each revealing separate incidents and new avenues for thought. The characters appear in mock battles reminiscent of arcade games such as Street Fighter and Mortal Kombat, tipping a hat to the world of Haraway's cyborgs, machine fetish/mythology and the tension between the zeitgeist and these emerging realities.

== Discography ==
=== Singles ===
The Beat Maras:

- The Huaraz EP

Paul Hawkins & Thee Awkward Silences:

- "The Evil Thoughts" (Split 7" with L'il Lost Lou) (Jezus Factory Records – 2007)
- "The Bigger Bone" (Jezus Factory Records – 2007)
- "I Believe in Karma" (Jezus Factory Records – 2008)
- "Don't Blind Me With Science" (Jezus Factory Records – 2008)
- "You Can't Make Somebody Love You" (Jezus Factory Records – 2008)
- "The Battle Is Not Yet Over" (Jezus Factory Records – 2008)

=== Albums ===
The Beat Maras:

- Bat and The Astral Phoenix

Paul Hawkins & Thee Awkward Silences:

- We Are Not Other People (Jezus Factory Records – 2008)
- Apologies to the Enlightenment (Jezus Factory Records – 2010)
