= Charlotte Badger =

Australian pirate (1778–1818?)

- Born: Bromsgrove, England
- Baptised: 31 July 1778
- Died: after 1843
- Criminal charge: Housebreaking
- Criminal penalty: Seven years' transportation to New South Wales
- Parent(s): Thomas and Ann Badger
- Piratical career
- Type: Pirate myth
- Base of operations: New South Wales

Charlotte Badger (1778 to after 1843) was a former convict who was on board the Venus during a mutiny in Tasmania in 1806. Taken to New Zealand, she was rescued by Captain Turnbull of the Indispensable, and eventually she returned to Sydney. In the intervening centuries, a number of writers have contributed to the fiction that she took an active role in the mutiny and she became known – erroneously – as Australia's first female pirate.

== Early life ==
Badger was born in 1778, the daughter of Thomas and Ann Badger. She was baptised on 31 July 1778. In June 1796, she was convicted at the Worcester Assizes of breaking into a house and stealing four guineas and a Queen Anne's half-crown. It was a capital offence but Badger was later reprieved and sentenced instead to transportation to New South Wales for seven years. She spent four years of her sentence in prison in England before she was boarded onto a ship.

== Mutiny ==
Badger arrived on the Earl Cornwallis in 1801. By August 1803 she had served her sentence and was a free woman in the colony. By April 1806 Badger had an infant child. That month, she travelled with her child aboard the Venus to Van Diemen's Land. There was another woman on the vessel, Catharine Hegarty, who shared the quarters of the first mate, Benjamin Burnet Kelly.

The Venus was a vessel chartered by the colonial government to carry supplies of salted pork and other food to Port Dalrymple in Van Diemen's Land. The Venus reached the port in the Tamar River on 16 June, on the northern coast of Tasmania. Soon after arriving, while its captain, Samuel Chace, was away from the vessel delivering some despatches, the first mate Kelly, the ship's pilot David Evans, and an army corporal Richard Thompson seized the ship and took it back out to sea.

A public notice in the Sydney Gazette on 20 July 1806 incorrectly described the two women, Badger and Hegarty, as convicts (they were both emancipated) and implied they were among the mutineers. Charlotte Badger was described as "a convict, very corpulent, with full face, thick lips, and light hair, has an infant child".

The mutineers sailed the Venus across the Tasman Sea and reached the Bay of Islands in New Zealand a few weeks later.

In December 1806, the Elizabeth captained by Captain Eber Bunker communicated with Captain Turnbull of the Indispensable when their ships were off the north coast of New Zealand. Turnbull reported to Bunker that the Venus had recently left the Bay of Islands, that two women and two children (one was likely a ship's boy) had been put ashore, along with first mate Kelly and a convict named John Lancashire who had been aboard the Venus. He also reported that one of the women (Catharine Hegarty) had died shortly afterwards. Captain Turnbull took Charlotte Badger and her child on board his ship. While it is not known exactly when the Indispensable was in the Bay of Islands, Badger had spent less than five months in New Zealand before she was rescued. Captain Bunker offered to take her and her child on board the Elizabeth, but Badger declined, and she was taken to Norfolk Island in the Indispensable. It was later reported that when Badger and Hegarty had been landed from the Venus in the Bay of Islands, the two women had been kept in their own quarters and the local Māori chiefs had declared them strongly tapu.

Charlotte Badger arrived back in Sydney on the Porpoise on 13 July 1807 from Norfolk Island. A note in the passenger list remarked: "Brought from New Zealand in the Indispensable and is one of the women who was in the Venus Schooner when ran away with from P. Dalrymple". There was no mention of her child and no further record of the infant has been found in New South Wales.

== Marriage ==
Badger was recorded in the February 1811 Muster for New South Wales (Earl Cornwallis). On 4 June that year she married Thomas Humphries, a private in the Invalid Company, at St Phillips Church in Sydney. (She was recorded as Charlotte Badgery in the register.) Humphries had arrived in the colony as a soldier on the Recovery in July 1808.

Badger was recorded in subsequent colonial records under her own name or under her married name of Humphries or variants of its spelling. In 1825, she was listed as Charlotte Badger in the New South Wales muster with a 10-year-old daughter, named Maria Badger. No further record of this daughter has been located.

The last record of Badger in New South Wales was on 5 July 1843 when she appeared before a judge in the Windsor court house in the Hawkesbury, accused of stealing a blanket. By then she was in her mid-sixties. Humphries, described as a householder, stood sureties for his wife. The charge against Badger was dismissed.

Thomas Humphries died on 25 December 1843 and was buried two days later at St Mathews in Windsor at the age 92.

Badger's eventual fate is unknown. No record of her death has been located as yet.

== Mythology and popular culture ==
The story of Badger's involvement in the mutiny on the Venus grew from the public notice in the Sydney Gazette in 1806 which implied she was one of the mutineers. However, Captain Chace of the Venus did not identify her as such in his newspaper account, which is the only contemporary record of the mutiny that survives. In 1895, "Old Colonial Story" in the Sydney Evening News provided a highly fictionalised story about Charlotte Badger. The author "Te Matan" was later revealed to be the author Louis Becke. In 1937, Roy Alexander, further embellished the myth of Badger as pirate in the Sydney Morning Herald, under the headline "Australia's Only Woman Pirate". These writers created the fiction - unsupported by any contemporary evidence - that Badger had led the mutiny on the Venus, stole its supplies and led her shipmates to New Zealand's Bay of Islands.

The myth of Charlotte Badger has provided the basis for several accounts within popular culture. She was the subject of a 2002 historical fiction novel Charlotte Badger - Buccaneer by author Angela Badger. This story was later transformed into a 2008 play by Euan Rose and staged in Charlotte’s home town of Bromagrove. New Zealand playwright Lorae Parry included Charlotte Badger in her play Vagabonds. In January 2013, Jack Hayter released Charlotte Badger on Audio Antihero records. A podcast, Black Sheep - Pirate Mystery: the story of Charlotte Badger, was produced by Radio New Zealand in 2018.

== Catharine Hegarty ==
Prior to the mutiny on the Venus, former convict Catharine Hegarty had returned to England from New South Wales with a pardon in 1800. As well as appearing in the public notice about the mutiny, her presence on the Venus in 1806 was cited by Captain Chace in his report in the Sydney Gazette.

== Venus and the mutineers ==
It was reported by Captain James Birnie of the Commerce in Sydney in 1807 that mutineers Kelly and Lancashire had been captured in the Bay of Islands though there is no further evidence to support this. Various claims have been made about the fate of the Venus, including that it was burned by Māori to retrieve its scrap metal, who then also cooked the men on board. There is some evidence that Kelly remained on the ship and sailed it across the Pacific Ocean to Chile.

== See also ==
- List of convicts transported to Australia
