= The Spitz =

Former music venue in London

Coordinates: 51°31′11″N 0°4′29″W

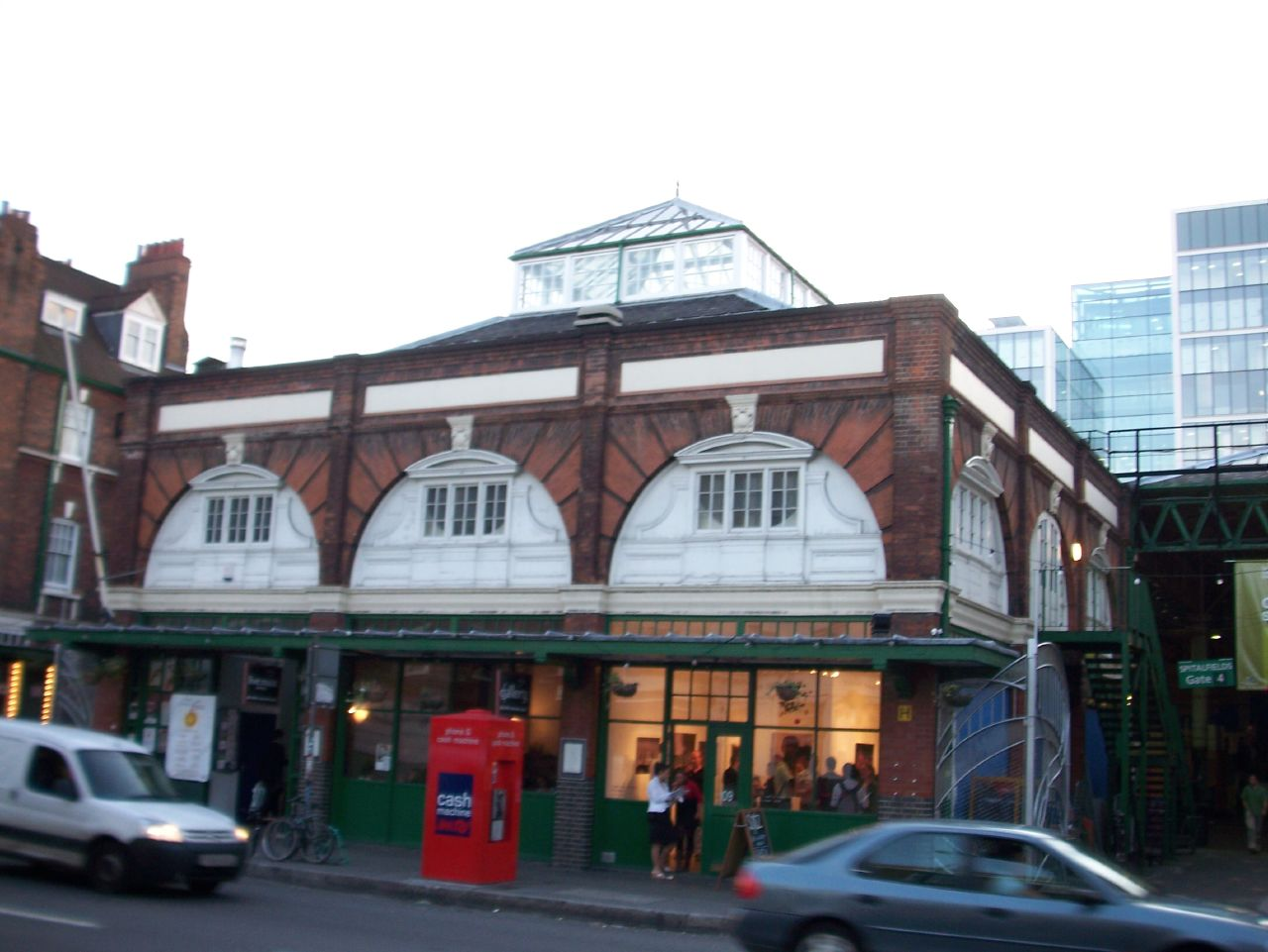
- The venue building in 2006
- Interactive map of The Spitz
- Location: East End, London
- Owner: The Dandelion Trust
- Capacity: 250 (standing); 220 (part seated); 180 (all seated)

Construction
- Opened: 1996

Website
- www.spitz.co.uk

The Spitz was a music venue in the East End of London, at 109 Commercial Street on the edge of the Old Spitalfields Market. The venue operated from 1996 to 2007, and was forced to close in a dispute about rent. In 2014, a group of regular performers at the venue adopted the name of "The Spitz" for a charitable trust that, "takes professional musicians into care homes, day centres and hospitals across London."

== Closure ==
In April 2007 the landlord of the premises, Ballymore Properties, gave The Dandelion Trust six months to move out, claiming that it had not kept up with its payments. The Spitz disputed this, insisting it had always paid its rent. Ballymore Properties agreed terms with another operator.

== Acts ==
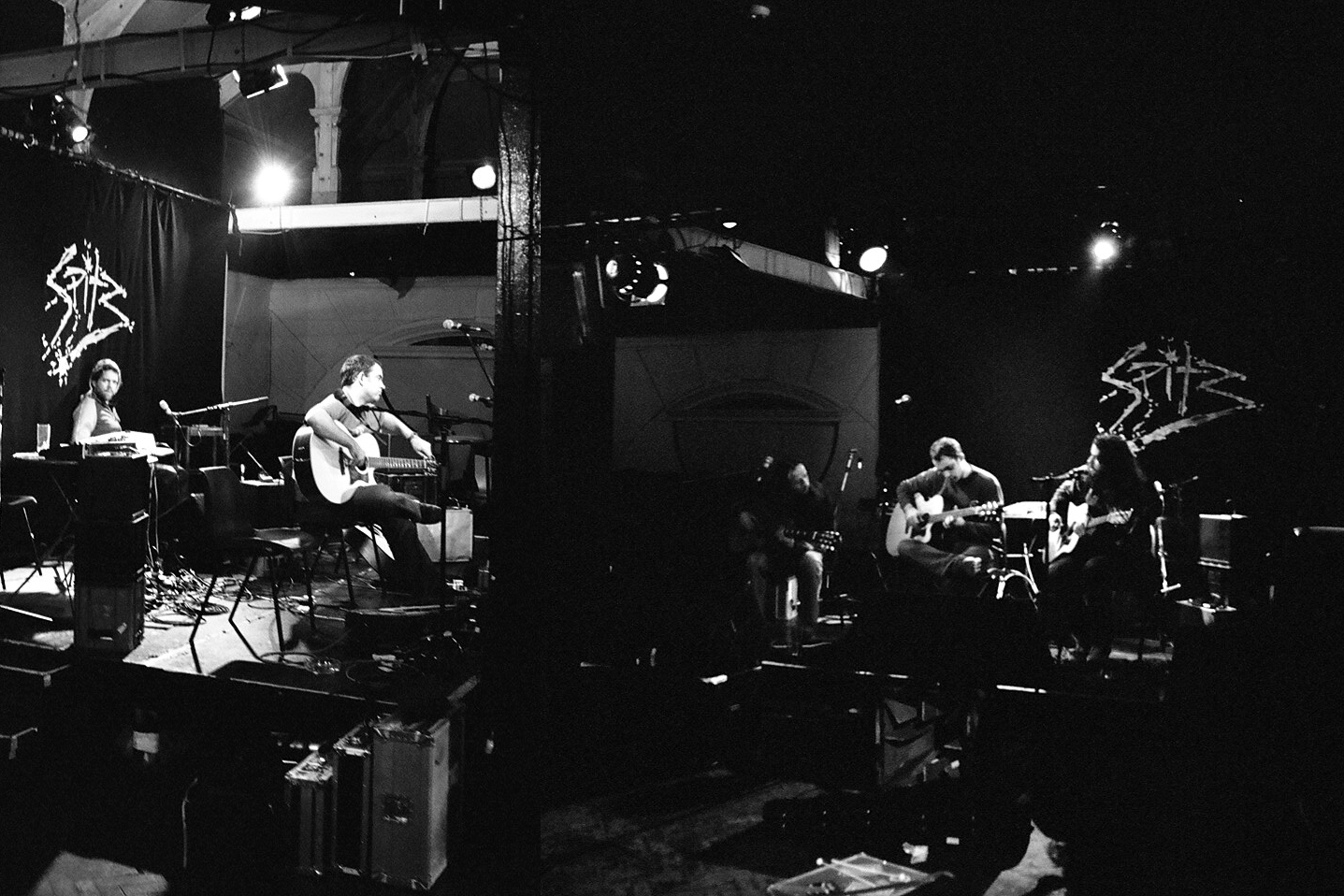
Rehearsals at the Spitz, 2007

Acts that played over the years at The Spitz include 17 Hippies, 3 Men & Black (The Selecter, The Stranglers, Bad Manners), A Hawk and a Hacksaw, Acoustic Ladyland, Adem, Ai Phoenix, Aiden Smith, Apparat, Athlete, Baba Maal, Bert Jansch, Beth Orton, Big Strides, Bikini Atoll, Billy Bragg, Billy Childish, Cat Empire, Cat Power, Charlie Winston, Chris T-T, Cobra Killer, Davey Graham, Dick Dale, David Thomas and Two Pale Boys Ed Harcourt, Fionn Regan, Fonda 500, Glen Matlock, GLORYHOLE! Goldfrapp , Gravenhurst, Great Lake Swimmers, Hayden, Historia, Holly Golightly, Florence and the Machine, Hot Chip, Jamie Woon, Joan As Police Woman, John Parish, John Renbourn, Joni Davis, Kate Nash, King Creosote, Lee Ranaldo (Sonic Youth), Little Axe, Little Barrie, Little Sparta, Low, Minutemen, Mr. Hudson, Nought, Omar, Pete and the Pirates, Pete Molinari, Phoenix, Pips, Chips and Video Clips, Polar Bear, Rachel Unthank (The Unthanks), Ralfe Band, Richard Hawley, Rodrigo Y Gabriela, Roy Harper, Seasick Steve, Son of Dave, Spiers & Boden, St. Thomas, Terry Edwards, Thalia Zedek, The Gossip, The Horrors, The Long Blondes, The Men They Couldn't Hang, The Wave Pictures, Tom Baxter, Tom Morello (Rage Against the Machine), Tunng, Turin Brakes, Vetiver feat Devendra Barnhart and many more. The Spitz hosted many notable shows, including the final performance of Nosferatu D2's live career.

The Spitz held its last concert on 27 September 2007, featuring many of the musicians that had played there regularly over the years, such as Seb Rochford (Acoustic Ladyland et al.), Miles Danso, Joe Wilkes, Sandy Dillon and Beth Orton.

== The Spitz Charitable Trust ==
The Spitz Charitable Trust, born out of the former music venue, came into being in January 2014 and "aims to take live music, using mainly jazz musicians, into a range of places, schools, after school clubs, prisons, residential care homes, day centres, the everyday settings of the street, and other places".
