= WVKR-FM =

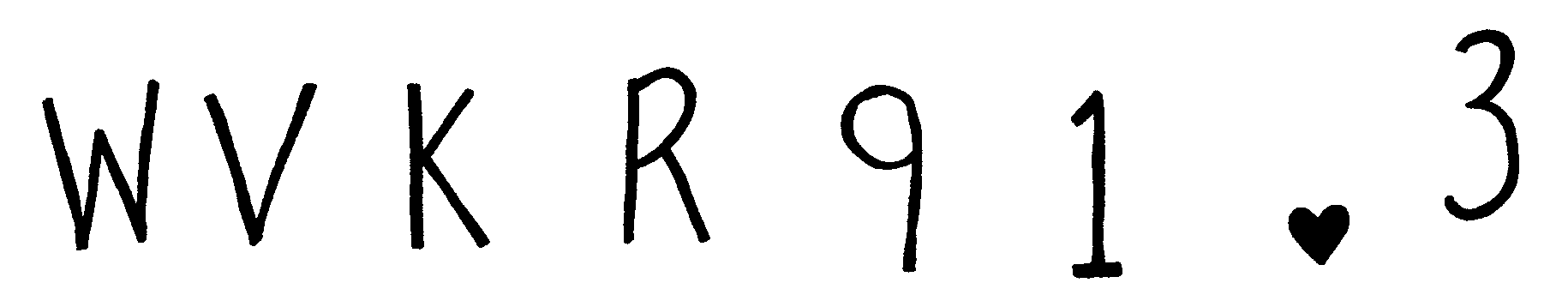
- Poughkeepsie, New York; United States
- Broadcast area: Mid-Hudson
- Frequency: 91.3 MHz
- Branding: Independent Radio

Programming
- Format: College radio
- Affiliations: Pacifica Radio Network

Ownership
- Owner: Vassar College

History
- First air date: December 8, 1971
- Call sign meaning: "Vassar Kollege [sic] Radio"

Technical information
- Licensing authority: FCC
- Facility ID: 69833
- Class: B1
- ERP: 3,700 watts
- HAAT: 250 meters
- Transmitter coordinates: 41°38′25.3″N 74°1′14.1″W

Links
- Public license information: Public file; LMS
- Website: www.wvkr.org

WVKR-FM (Independent Radio) is a college radio station owned by and primarily staffed by students of Vassar College in the town of Poughkeepsie, New York. The station broadcasts on 91.3 MHz at 3,700 watts ERP from a tower in Milton, New York with a directional signal to the south.

== History ==
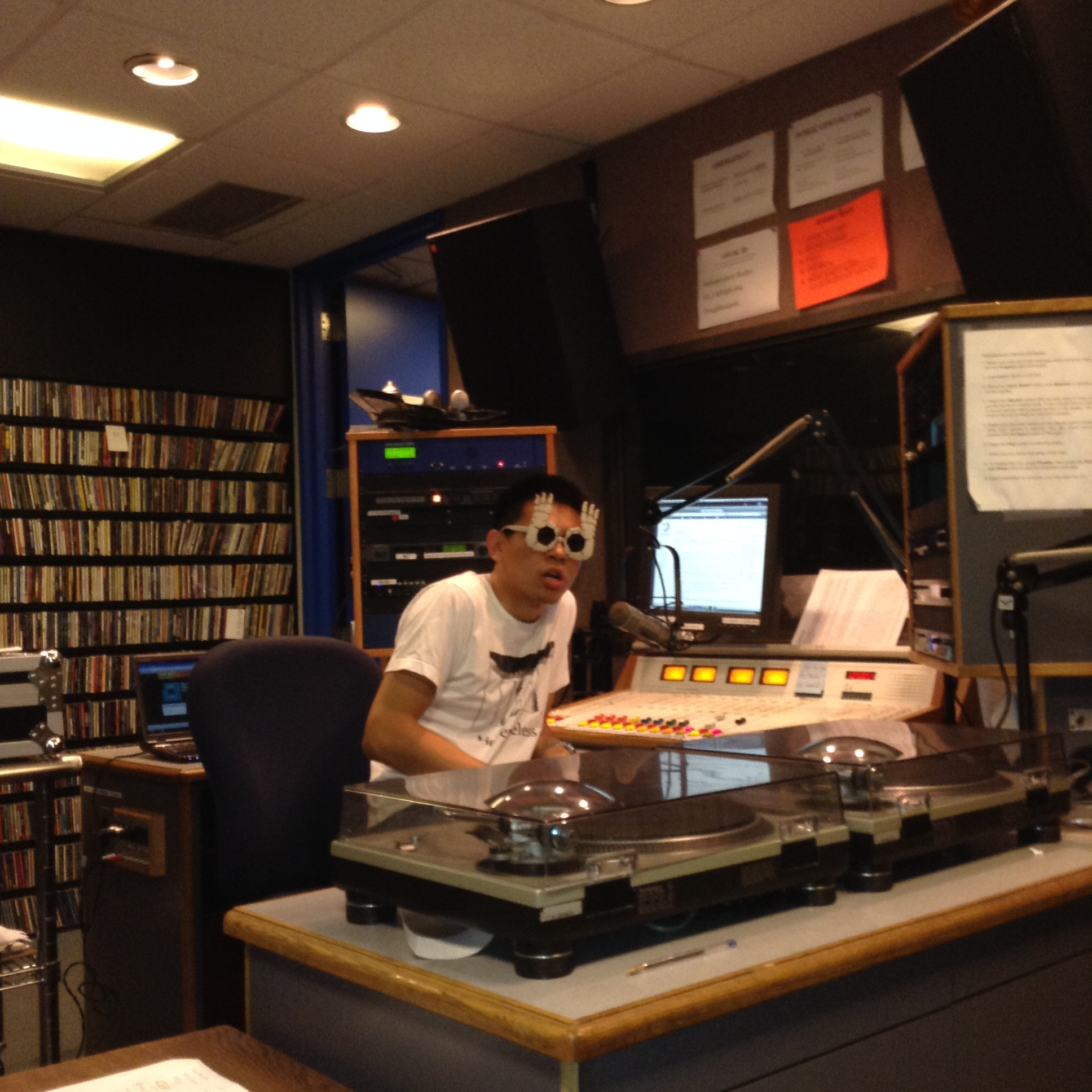
The WVKR studio in 2013

When Vassar College became a co-educational institution in 1969, the school began plans to launch a campus radio station to serve both the campus and the nearby communities. Originally, the college planned to apply for a low-power license; however, a decision was made to seek a full-power license when the tower site of WEOK-FM was donated to Vassar College after the construction of a new tower in Illinois Mountain in Marlboro. WVKR signed on from this tower on a test basis in December 1971 with full operations commencing after upgrades to the tower were made in March 1972. The station was granted permission to broadcast on FM in 1975. During the early Coronavirus pandemic, the station continued broadcasting, with some shows recorded remotely.

For its entire existence, WVKR has been a primarily student-run station with a core staff of community volunteers running some programs on the station. Key programming on the station includes blues, jazz, hip hop, vintage rock, polka music, world music, classical, Cajun/Zydeco, talk, and indie rock, among others.

The station plays a range of artists, including local (Larry Campbell, Avery Friedman, CIAO MALZ) and out of state/international artists (Tiberius, Jorma Kaukonen, The Noisy,) in addition to their social, political, and activist programming.
