= Daylight Storms =

Studio album by Air Formation
- Released: 12 February 2007
- Genre: Shoegaze; Space rock
- Length: 50:35
- Label: Club AC30
- Producer: Pat Coller

Air Formation chronology
Stay Inside/Feel Everything (2004)	Daylight Storms (2007)	It's Over Now/Formation 2 (2007)

Professional ratings
Review scores
Source	Rating
Drowned in Sound	(9/10)

Daylight Storms is the third album by the English group Air Formation. It was released on the label Club AC30 on 12 February 2007.

== Track listing ==
1. "Cold Morning" – 5:18
2. "Tidal" – 4:15
3. "Daylight Storms" – 4:52
4. "I Can't Remember Waking Up" – 3:54
5. "Into View" – 4:31
6. "Formation 1" – 4:41
7. "You Have to Go Somewhere" – 6:29
8. "Adrift" – 3:18
9. "The Dark Has Fallen" – 5:43
10. "Before We Forget" – 7:34
