= The Lullaby Trust =

British charity organization

The Lullaby Trust (formerly FSID) is a British charitable organisation aiming to prevent unexpected deaths in infancy and promote infant health. The Lullaby Trust funds research, supports families whose babies have died suddenly and unexpectedly, disseminates information on infant health, baby care and sudden infant deaths to health professionals and the general public, and works with professionals to improve investigations when a baby dies.

== History ==
Over half a century ago – in 1971 – a meeting was convened in Cambridge as a result of one grandmother's search to find out why her baby grandson had died suddenly and unexpectedly. This gathering led to the founding of the world's first organisation devoted to research, information and support in the field of infant deaths.

Since The Lullaby Trust teamed up with the Department of Health to launch the campaign to reduce the risk of sudden infant death in 1991, the UK sudden infant death rate has fallen by 80%, and has been hailed one of the most successful public health campaigns ever, estimated to have saved more than 30,000 lives.

The Lullaby Trust has gone on to become one of the world's leading authorities on sudden infant death, the UK's largest funder of medical research into sudden infant death, the main source of support for bereaved families and a major information provider.

== Services ==
- Helpline for parents, carers and health professionals and bereaved families.
- A wide range of publications and resources on reducing the risk of Sudden infant death syndrome and safe baby care, available from the website.
- A network of trained befrienders to support bereaved families.
- A busy programme of training, events and Family Days Out throughout the UK.
- The Care of Next Infant Scheme, with the NHS, to support bereaved families during and after the birth of their subsequent children.
- The CONI Plus Scheme offers help to families who may have reason to be anxious about the birth of their child. For example, if they are close relatives of a baby that has suffered a sudden infant death, have lost a baby to causes other than sudden infant death or have a baby who has experienced an apparent life-threatening event.

== Fundraising ==
Events to raise money for The Lullaby Trust range from skydives to marathons, treks and cycles. An example of a fundraising event is the Mile in Memory walk, undertaken to honour the life of someone special to the supporter. In 2012, the event raised £67,000 and took place in over 65 different venues.

== Supporters ==
In 2012, British Independent Record label, Audio Antihero, released a benefit compilation album titled Some.Alternate.Universe to raise money for The Lullaby Trust. The album featured artists like Jeffrey Lewis, Nosferatu D2, Jonah Matranga, Benjamin Shaw, Eddie Argos (Art Brut), Jack Hayter (Hefner), Still Corners, Fighting Kites, Johnny Foreigner, Paul Hawkins & The Awkward Silences.
