= Boston Hassle =

Regional music news website

Boston Hassle is a website that highlights underground and experimental music and arts in the greater Boston area. Its goal is to showcase underrepresented genres and artists. Boston Hassle is a volunteer non-profit organization.

== History ==
Created initially by Dan Shea as Bodies of Water Arts and Crafts, the organization began by releasing and booking music. Shea started the Hassle Fest in 2009. In 2011, he started the Boston Hassle website. In 2014, Shea started the Hassle Flea with Caitlin Kenney.

In 2018, Boston Hassle took over an art space called Dorchester Art Project, in Dorchester Massachusetts. However, in 2019 the organization left Dorchester after splitting from the Brain Arts Organization.

== Activities ==
The Boston Hassle website reviews music, art, and film. It also includes a "Culture" section featuring varying forms of local journalism, and an events calendar. Shows hosted by Boston Hassle range from noise and punk to experimental hip-hop and rap, along with visual art and poetry. The Dig describes Boston Hassle as fostering, "an innovative, compelling, and interconnected experience through grassroots and inclusive participatory culture".

Boston Hassle sponsors two large events: Hassle Fest and Boston Hassle Flea (fka The Black Market Market). Hassle Fest is a two to three day music and art festival. Hosted in a different location each year, Hassle Fest hosts musicians from all genres and varying visual artists. The event all-ages as most Hassle events are.

Hassle Flea is a bimonthly event in which local businesses, artists and a large selection of crafts sell their work.

Boston Hassle also operate as a record label, issuing a series of compilations that feature artists including Tiberius, Black Helicopter, Miami Doritos, Sweet Petunia, and others.
