= Audio Antihero =

British independent record label

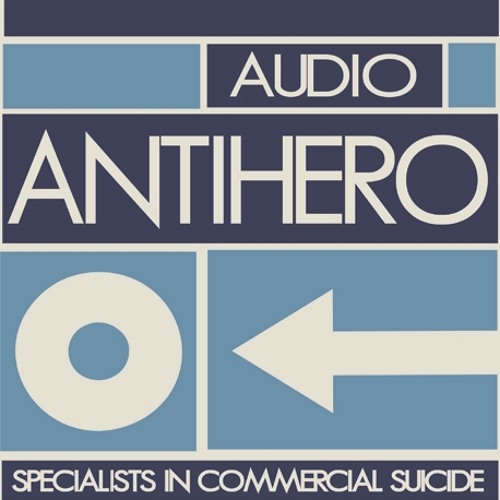
- Founded: 2009
- Founder: Jamie Halliday
- Distributor: Kudos Records Ltd.
- Genre: Indie / Lo-Fi / Alternative / Indie Folk / Indie Pop / Experimental
- Country of origin: United Kingdom
- Location: Staten Island, New York
- Official website: http://www.audioantihero.com

Audio Antihero is an independent record label founded in October 2009 with a South East London base, now located in Staten Island, New York. The label has released titles from Frog, Nosferatu D2, Cloud, Magana, CIAO MALZ, Tiberius, Avery Friedman, Leilani Patao, The Noisy, Josaleigh Pollett, Darren Hayman, and others.

== History ==
=== Early years (2009–2013) ===
Audio Antihero launched in October 2009, with its first two releases being Nosferatu D2's We're Gonna Walk Around This City With Our Headphones on to Block Out the Noise and Benjamin Shaw's I Got the Pox, the Pox Is What I Got.

In 2011, the label released a series of EPs from Jack Hayter, Broken Shoulder, Wartgore Hellsnicker, Paul Hawkins & The Awkward Silences and Fighting Kites, and Benjamin Shaw's debut full-length album There's Always Hope, There's Always Cabernet.

Between 2012 and 2013, the label released a twelve-part singles from Jack Hayter entitled The Sisters of St. Anthony.

=== Additions to the roster and hiatus (2013–2023) ===
Between 2013 and 2016, Cloud, Frog, Magana, The Superman Revenge Squad Band, and CHUCK joined the Audio Antihero roster for a series of releases that ran until 2019. The label also continued to issue new titles from Benjamin Shaw, and released albums from defunct groups Low Low Low La La La Love Love Love and Tempertwig.

The label became mostly inactive after a series of compilations and expanded editions of previous catalogue releases.

=== Return from hiatus (2023–present) ===
The label returned from hiatus in late 2023 for the release of Frog's Grog album. Two more Frog albums followed in 2025.

Magana and Ben and Adam Parker (as My Best Unbeaten Brother) returned to the label for new releases, and roster received new additions between 2024 and 2025 in CIAO MALZ, Avery Friedman, Leilani Patao, Josaleigh Pollett, The Noisy, and Tiberius.

In 2026, Audio Antihero released Frog's Frog for Sale album, and announced If I Let It Quiet by Josaleigh Pollett and 'daisy deluxe' by Leilani Patao. The label also began working with Darren Hayman, reissuing an expanded edition of 'The Violence' in June.

After a series of singles and premieres, Pollett's If I Let It Quiet was released on July 24 2026, and accompanied by a tour of Pacific Northwest and East Coast. The album received 8/10 from New Noise Magazine and 9/10 from PopMatters, and peaked at #70 in the NACC 200, due to station support.

In a continuation of the project with Darren Hayman, Audio Antihero released the TV Themes EP by The French in September 2026. The following month, the label released the "You Move" single by Avery Friedman. On October 16, the I'm Your Team LP by Darren Hayman was released, an album that was creatured only with only Hayman's voice, a Yamaha DX7, a Roland TR-707, and a Rickenbacker bass guitar.

== Discography ==
=== Albums ===
- Nosferatu D2 – We're Gonna Walk Around This City With Our Headphones On To Block Out The Noise (2009)
- Benjamin Shaw – There's Always Hope, There's Always Cabernet (2011)
- Cloud – Comfort Songs (2013)
- The Superman Revenge Squad Band – There Is Nothing More Frightening Than the Passing of Time (2013)
- Benjamin Shaw – Goodbye, Cagoule World (2014)
- Low Low Low La La La Love Love Love – Last (2015 – co-released with Other Electricities)
- Frog – Kind of Blah (2015)
- Frog – Frog (Reissue – 2015)
- CHUCK – Frankenstein Songs for the Grocery Store (2017)
- Cloud – Plays With Fire (2018)
- Benjamin Shaw – Megadead (2018 – co-released with Kirigirsu Recordings)
- Frog – Whatever We Probably Already Had It (2018)
- Frog - Count Bateman (2019 - co-released with Tapewormies)
- Benjamin Shaw – I Got The Pox, The Pox Is What I Got (Remastered & Expanded) (2020 - co-released with Old Money Records)
- Benjamin Shaw – There's Always Hope, There's Always Cabernet (Remastered & Expanded) (2020 - co-released with Old Money Records)
- Frog – Grog (2023, co-released with Tapewormies)
- Magana – Teeth (2024, co-released with Colored Pencils)
- Frog – 1000 Variations on the Same Song (2025, co-released with Tapewormies)
- Avery Friedman – New Thing (2025)
- The Noisy – The Secret Ingredient Is Even More Meat (2025)
- Frog – THE COUNT (2025, co-released with Tapewormies)
- Tiberius – Troubadour (2025)
- Frog – Frog for Sale (2026, co-released with Tapewormies)
- Hayman, Watkins, Trout And Lee – Hayman, Watkins, Trout And Lee [Bonus Tracks] (2026, co-released with Belka)
- Darren Hayman & The Long Parliament – The Violence [Expanded Edition] (2026, co-released with Belka)
- Josaleigh Pollett – If I Let It Quiet (2026, co-released with Lavender Vinyl)
- Darren Hayman – I'm Your Team (2026)

=== EPs ===
- Benjamin Shaw – I Got The Pox, The Pox Is What I Got (2009)
- Jack Hayter – Sucky Tart (2011)
- Broken Shoulder – Broken Shoulderrr (2011)
- Wartgore Hellsnicker – Moderate Rock (2011)
- Paul Hawkins & The Awkward Silences – The Wrong Life (2011)
- Fighting Kites & Broken Shoulder – Split (2011)
- Benjamin Shaw / Cloud / Jack Hayter / Broken Shoulder - You & Me (2014)
- Nosferatu D2 – Older, Wiser, Sadder EP (2015)
- Magana – Golden Tongue EP (2016)
- Tempertwig - Films Without Plotlines EP (2019 – co-released with Randy Sadage Records)
- My Best Unbeaten Brother – Pessimistic Pizza (2024)
- CIAO MALZ – Safe Then Sorry EP (2024)
- Magana – Bad News EP (2025)
- Leilani Patao – daisy (2025)
- Leilani Patao - diasy deluxe (2026)
- The French – TV Themes (2026)

=== Singles ===
- Frog – Judy Garland (2015)
- Frog – Photograph (2015)
- Frog – Catchyalater (2016)
- Magana – Get It Right (2016)
- Magana – Pages – Single (2017)
- Magana – Oceans (2017)
- Magana – Inches Apart (2017)
- My Best Unbeaten Brother – Slayer on a Sunny Day (2023)
- Chuck – Nothing Matters to Me Now (2024)
- Magana – Paul (2024, co-released with Colored Pencils)
- Magana – Break Free (2024, co-released with Colored Pencils)
- My Best Unbeaten Brother – Time on Our Hands, Spider-Man (2024)
- My Best Unbeaten Brother – Extraordinary Times (2024)
- My Best Unbeaten Brother – Blues Fatigue (2024)
- CIAO MALZ – Two Feet Tall (2024)
- Frog – Did Santa Come (2024, co-released with Tapewormies)
- Frog – Mixtape Liner Notes Var. VII (2025, co-released with Tapewormies)
- Avery Friedman – Flowers Fell' (2025)
- Frog – Just Use Your Hips Var. VI (2025, co-released with Tapewormies)
- Avery Friedman – Photo Booth (2025)
- Frog – Housebroken Var. IV (2025, co-released with Tapewormies)
- Avery Friedman – New Thing (2025)
- The Noisy – Twos (2025)
- Tiberius – Sag (2025)
- Tiberius – Felt (2025)
- Tiberius – Moab (2025)
- Tiberius – Painting of a Tree (2025)
- The Noisy – Grenadine (2025)
- The Noisy - Nightshade (2025)
- The Noisy – Neckline (Deluxe Version) (2025)
- Leilani Patao – Cut (2025)
- Leilani Patao – BIRD WHISLE (2025)
- Josaleigh Pollett – Radio Player (2025)
- Leilani Patao – Red Hair Dye (2025)
- Frog – Je Ne Sais Pas (2026, co-released with Tapewormies)
- Frog – Dark Out (2026, co-released with Tapewormies)
- Leilani Patao –kiddy scissors (2026)
- Josaleigh Pollett – The Witness (2026)
- Josaleigh Pollett – Like a River (2026)
- Josaleigh Pollett – Bed of Quiet (2026)
- Avery Friedman – You Move (2026)

=== Live Albums ===
- Nosferatu D2 – Live at The Spitz (2012)
- Cloud – Live at Kulak's Woodshed (2019)
- Benjamin Shaw – Live at donaufestival (2019)

=== Compilations ===
- Various Artists – Bob Hope would. (2011) – digital charity compilation for Japan
- Various Artists – Some.Alternate.Universe. (2012) – digital charity compilation for FSID
- Jack Hayter – The Sisters of St. Anthony (2012–2013) – digital singles series
- Various Artists – The Hüsker Du-wop EP (2012) – digital charity EP for New York's Independent Music Community
- Various Artists – Regal vs Steamboat (2013) – digital charity compilation for Rape Crisis
- Various Artists – Audio Antihero's Commercial Suicide Sampler (2013)
- Various Artists – Five Long Years (2014)
- Chuck – My Band Is a Computer (2016 – co-released with Old Money Records)
- Various Artists – Audio Antihero Presents: 'Unpresidented Jams' for SPLC & NILC (2017)
- Various Artists – Bern Yr Idols (2016) – digital benefit compilation for the Bernie Sanders presidential campaign
- Various Artists – The Desperation Club – A Cloud Tribute Compilation (2018)
- Various Artists – Elder Statesman: Nine Long Years of Audio Antihero Records (2019)
- Tempertwig – Fake Nostalgia: An Anthology of Broken Stuff (2019 – co-released with Randy Sadage Records)
- Benjamin Shaw – Exciting Opportunities: A Collection of Singles and Sadness (2019 – co-released with Old Money Records)
- Fighting Kites – Mustard After Dinner - An Anthology of Fighting Kites (2019 - co-released with Old Money Records)
- Benjamin Shaw – Should've Stayed at Home: A Collection of Oddities and Outtakes (2019 - co-released with Old Money Records)
- Broken Shoulder – Shark Islands: A Broken Shoulder Archipelago (2019 - co-released with Old Money Records)
- Various Artists – The Horrible Truth About Palestine - a Fundraiser for the United Palestinian Appeal (2021)
