= Leilani Patao =

Hawaiian-American musician

- Genres: Indie, Hyperpop, Singer-Songwriter, Electronic
- Occupations: Musician, engineer
- Label: Audio Antihero

Leilani Patao is a Hawaiian-American musician, vocalist and songwriter from Los Angeles, California. They are based in Brooklyn, New York.

== Education and musical theater (2012 - 2026) ==
Leilani Patao began their musical theater and songwriting education at the Jaxx Theatricals Conservatory before enrolling at Los Angeles County High School for the Arts, where they performed in productions including Jesus Christ Superstar.

In 2021, Patao performed at the "I’m Still Here" virtual benefit for The New York Public Library for the Performing Arts’ Billy Rose Theatre Division. That same year, they appeared, as a representative of LACHSA, in "Louder Than Words: High School Edition” to promote tick… tick… BOOM!.

In 2022, Patao performed at the American Theater Wing gala. The following year, they were a finalist in the 2023 Write Out Loud songwriting competition.

During their academic career, Patao received awards and nominations from the National Endowment for the Arts, YoungArts, the National Youth Arts Awards, and the Andrew Lloyd Webber Initiative. They also received a scholarship from the Jack Kent Cook Foundation.

== Singer-songwriter career (2021 - present) ==
=== Early releases (2021 - 2024) ===
In 2021, Leilani Patao began self-releasing albums of their original songs with The Lovers Reversed, which was followed by You Always Loved Reading the next year. Patao also played and recorded with the Prophet Tree punk band.

Between March and June 2024, Patao issued the "Make Believe," “I Know," and "LABEL" singles. Patao appeared on the June 17 broadcast of The Tonight Show Starring Jimmy Fallon as part of the "Battle of the Instant Songwriters." The But What If? album was released on July 19.

=== Label debut (2025 - present) ===
In July 2025, Leilani Patao deejayed an "Intern Mix" set for Bayonet Records on The Lot Radio. In September, they debuted on the Audio Antihero, and released with the "Cut" single, which was followed by "BIRD WHISTLE" in October. The daisy EP was issued on November 7.

daisy was followed by the "Red Hair Dye" single and remixes by Benjamin Shaw and iyrliaes.

Patao withheld these 2025 releases from streaming services.

== Discography ==
=== Albums ===
- The Lovers Reversed (Self-Released, 2021)
- You Always Loved Reading (Self-Released, 2022)
- But What If? (Self-Released, 2024)

=== EPs ===
- daisy (Audio Antihero, 2025)

=== Singles ===
- "Make Believe” (Self-Released, 2024)
- "I Know" (Self-Released, 2024)
- "LABEL" (Self-Released, 2024)
- "Cut" (Audio Antihero, 2025)
- "BIRD WHISTLE" (Audio Antihero, 2025)
- "Red Hair Dye" (Audio Antihero, 2025)

=== Compilation appearances ===
- #IWriteMusicals: Musical Theater Songwriter Challenge [2020 Edition] (American Theatre Wing, 2020) – Contributed "Mauna Kea”

=== Other credits ===
- Miai – "I Will Shine (Miai's Song)" (Hear Your Song, 2022) - Arrangement and performance
- Nico Bauwer – What's Left (Rat's Nest Records, 2022) - Backing vocals (tracks 3–4, 11)
- Nico Bauwer – The Right Things for Us Now (Self-Released, 2022) - Bass and vocals (track 1)
- Prophet Tree – "Missing – Single" (Flower Shop Audio, 2024) - Vocals, writing and production
- Linchpin – "Around the Knife - Single" (Nosedive Records, 2024) - Backing vocals
- Prophet Tree – Goes ___ (Flower Shop Audio, 2024) - Backing Vocals, writing, and production (track 6) + Drum production (tracks 1–16)
- Misster – Admit We're Lost (Love Your Shoes Music, 2025) - Bass (Track 7), Backing Vocals (track 10)
- Grace Church – "South - Single" (Self-Released, 2025) - Production, mixing, and engineering
