= Paul Hawkins (musician) =

British musician

- Origin: England
- Genres: Post punk outsider music
- Years active: 2006-present
- Labels: Jezus Factory Records; Audio Antihero; Fleeing from Pigeons Records; AFUK Records; Blang Records
- Members: Paul Hawkins, Ian Button, Mary Boe, Chris Potter, David Woolf, Adam Croucher, Anthony Keen
- Past members: Alex Templeton-Ward, David Serra, Niall Spooner-Harvey, Jeremy Walton, Stuart Saunderson

Paul Hawkins is a British author, singer-songwriter, and disability rights advocate. He grew up near Bristol and has been active in London's antifolk scene. He has collaborated with Ian Button and a six-piece band under the name of Paul Hawkins & The (sometimes stylised "Thee") Awkward Silences, and has also worked with the artist Alex Templeton-Ward.

His debut solo album The Misdiagnosis of Paul Hawkins was released on AFUK Records in 2006, later reissued the Fleeing from Pigeons net label in April 2009.

Paul Hawkins & The Awkward Silences performed on the BBC Introducing stage at Latitude Festival 2008, and recorded a BBC Radio 1 session for Huw Stephens. They released two albums on Jezus Factory Records between 2008 and 2010, as well as an EP via Audio Antihero in 2011.

In 2011, Hawkins was a contestant on the Pointless season 4, and The Awkward Silences recorded a session for Dandelion Radio in October. A session for Resonance FM followed in January 2012. In 2014, The Awkward Silences performed at Liberty Festival.

In 2013, Hawkins' first book, Bad Santas and Other Creepy Christmas Characters, was published by Simon & Schuster UK.

The Awkward Silences released Outsider Pop in 2016, and an eponymous album in 2020. The King of Cats album, featuring new members Anthony Keen and David Woolf, was released in 2025.

Hawkins is a disability rights advocate, and works for the Attitude Is Everything charity.

== Discography ==
=== Singles ===
- "The Evil Thoughts" (Split 7" with L'il Lost Lou) (Jezus Factory Records, 2007)
- "The Bigger Bone" (Jezus Factory Records, 2007)
- "I Believe in Karma" (Jezus Factory Records, 2008)
- "Don't Blind Me With Science" (Jezus Factory Records. 2008)
- "You Can't Make Somebody Love You" (Jezus Factory Records, 2008)
- "The Battle Is Over" (Jezus Factory Records, 2008)
- "Tonight I Will Be Santa" (Fika Recordings, 2011) as Paul Hawkins & The Bleak Midwinters
- "You Can't Make Somebody Love You" / "Of Course I Stole The Train" (Audio Antihero, 2011)

=== Albums/EPs ===
- The Misdiagnosis of Paul Hawkins (AFUK Records, 2006 / Fleeing from Pigeons Records, 2009)
- We Are Not Other People (Jezus Factory Records, 2008)
- Skinful of Silence (Fleeing from Pigeons Records, 2009)
- Apologies To The Enlightenment (Jezus Factory Records, 2010)
- The Wrong Life EP (Audio Antihero, 2011)
- Dandelion Session EP (BarelyOut Recordings/Audio Antihero, 2012)
- Outsider Pop (Blang Records, 2016)
- The Awkward Silences (Blang Records, 2020)
- King of Cats (Blang Records, 2020)

=== Compilation tracks ===
- "I'll Be Getting a Divorce for Christmas" on A Very Cherry Christmas Volume 2 (Cherryade Records, 2006)
- "I Fell in Love With a Moment in Time" on Welcome Back to the Jezus Factory (Jezus Factory Records, 2007)
- "I Like It When You Call Me Doctor" on AFUK & I (AFUK Records, 2007)
- "I'll Take Good Care of You" on Bob Hope Would (Audio Antihero, 2011)
- "I've Left The New World Order (stripped)" on Some.Alternate.Universe for FSID (Audio Antihero, 2012)
- "Johnny (Dandelion Session)" on Into The Light: Volume Two for Pussy Riot (Unwashed Territories, 2012)
- "A Crappy Couple" on REGAL VS STEAMBOAT for Rape Crisis (Audio Antihero, 2013)
