= God Is in the TV =

Online music magazine

- Website type: Online magazine
- Available in: English
- Creator: Bill Cummings
- Editor: Bill Cummings
- Website: godisinthetvzine.co.uk
- Launched: 2003; 23 years ago
- Current status: Active

God Is in the TV is an independent music and culture online magazine founded by editor Bill Cummings in Cardiff in 2003. It publishes independent music reviews, features, interviews, podcasts and media. The webzine's coverage varies from unsigned and independent artists to major-label releases.

Album reviews by God Is in the TV are used on the review aggregator site AnyDecentMusic?. Interviews and reviews by the webzine have been cited by publications such as The Guardian, NME, Drowned in Sound, and Gigwise. The webzine has released a series of free downloads, and in November 2006 released a compilation album, God Is in the CD. Writers from God Is in the TV have appeared on BBC Radio 6 Music, and been shortlisted or won awards at the BT Digital Music Awards and The Association of Independent Festivals.

God Is In the TV has premiered material from artists like Frog, CIAO MALZ, Tiberius, The Noisy, and numerous others.
