= Ciao Malz =

American singer-songwriter

- Genres: Indie, singer-songwriter
- Occupation: Musician
- Label: Audio Antihero

Ciao Malz (stylized in all caps) is a Brooklyn-based indie rock project by Filipino American multi-instrumentalist Malia DelaCruz, in collaboration with James Chrisman and Felix Walworth.

== Early life ==
Malia DelaCruz was born and raised in Waterford, Connecticut. She relocated to New York City in 2014 to attend St. John's University in Queens.

== Music career ==
DelaCruz issued her first single under the CIAO MALZ name (Always Be My Maybe) on May 28, 2021, following it with a series of self-releases. In August of 2023, DelaCruz recorded a cover of Frog's You Know I’m Down.

On November 15, 2024, CIAO MALZ released the Two Feet Tall single via Audio Antihero. The Safe Then Sorry EP followed on December 6, 2024.

In March, she published a cover of "Clementine" by Elliott Smith.

== Discography ==
=== EPs ===
- To Go (CIAOMONEY RECORDS, 2022)
- Safe Then Sorry (Audio Antihero, 2024)

=== Singles ===
- Always Be My Maybe (CIAOMONEY RECORDS, 2021)
- Tracks (CIAOMONEY RECORDS, 2021)
- Circumstancey (CIAOMONEY RECORDS, 2022)
- Same Thing (CIAOMONEY RECORDS, 2023)
- Pearl (CIAOMONEY RECORDS, 2023)
- Two Feet Tall (Audio Antihero, 2024)

=== Compilation Appearances ===
- Rue Defense Tape Club: December 2025 (Rue Defense, 2025) - Contributes "Two Feets Tall"

=== Other credits ===
- Various Artists – For Palestine (GUNK, 2023) – Bass on "Gorilla vs. Cold Water (live)" by Sister.
- Avery Friedman – Flowers Fell – Single (Self-Release, 2024 / Audio Antihero, 2025) – Additional Recording
- Avery Friedman – Photo Booth – Single (Audio Antihero, 2025) – Additional Recording
- Avery Friedman – New Thing – Single (Audio Antihero, 2025) – Additional Recording
- Avery Friedman – New Thing – Album (Audio Antihero, 2025) – Additional Recording
