= Post-Trash =

Online music magazine

- Website type: Online magazine
- Available in: English
- Creator: Dan Goldin
- Editor: Pat Pilch / Niccolo Porcello
- Website: post-trash.com
- Launched: 2015; 11 years ago
- Current status: Active

Post-Trash is an independent music online magazine founded by Exploding in Sound co-owner Dan Goldin in 2015.

== History ==
Post-Trash was founded by its editor Dan Goldin in 2015. The publication’s coverage specializes in independent releases and Indie Rock. The site’s editorial includes interviews, reviews, think pieces, and premieres.

In addition to its editorial output, Post-Trash has promoted and hosted live events including the Ugly Trash Fest (in collaboration with The Ugly Hug publication) and SXSW showcases. They have also released compilation albums to raise money for Planned Parenthood, RAICES, and María Fund. Contributing artists to these compilations have included Deerhoof, Ian Sweet, and Pile.

In 2024, Goldin ceased editing Post-Trash, and the role was filled by Pat Pilch and Niccolo Porcello.

Post-Trash’s editorial has been referenced or cited by publications including Pitchfork, Stereogum, Rolling Stone Australia / New Zealand, Tiny Mix Tapes, Daily Kos, Vice, Jensaispop, Uncut, The Fader, Paste, NEPM, Adafruit Industries, New University, and others.
