= Bush Radio (South Africa) =

Coordinates: 33°55′57″S 18°27′24″E

Cape Town, Western Cape, South Africa; South Africa
- Frequency: 89.5 MHz (FM)

Programming
- Format: community radio

History
- First air date: April 25, 1993

Links
- Website: Bush Radio

Bush Radio is a popular and pioneering community radio station in South Africa. The station broadcasts programs in English, Afrikaans and isiXhosa from Salt River, Cape Town on 89.5 MHz FM, with a music and talk format aimed at the 18 to 39 age group.

== Early life ==
Bush Radio started out as a project of the Cassette Education Trust during the last stages of the struggle against apartheid. Its programmes were distributed on cassette tape. Many of its volunteers and programmers were students from the University of the Western Cape, which did not at the time have its own campus radio station.

After being denied broadcast licenses on two occasions by South Africa's broadcast regulator, the station launched as an illegal pirate radio station on April 25, 1993, but was shut down by authorities within a few hours. With the democratization of South Africa around the time of the 1994 elections, however, the station was soon granted a temporary broadcasting license, becoming one of the first media outlets in South Africa not owned by either the government or a commercial media company. Due to bureaucratic difficulties surrounding the country's transition to democracy, however, the station only received yearly temporary license renewals until being granted its first permanent broadcasting license in 2002.

In its original incarnation, the station was led by Edric Gorfinkel. Once the station became a licensed operation, its management was taken over by Zane Ibrahim, who oversaw the station's transformation from an anti-apartheid activist project into a broader community-oriented broadcaster. Station volunteer Lumko Mtimde was also tapped to head the National Community Radio Forum, an organization which helped to establish a legislative and collaborative framework for the establishment and expansion of community radio in South Africa, and later became a member of South Africa's new broadcast regulator, the Independent Broadcasting Authority.

In 2000 Bush Radio received one of the Prince Claus Awards in the theme "Urban Heroes".

== Services ==
In addition to the radio service, Bush Radio also offers media training, multimedia and community development programs.
