= The 405 (magazine) =

Online music magazine

- Website type: Online magazine
- Available in: English
- Creator: Oliver Primus
- Editor: Oliver Primus
- Website: www.thefourohfive.com
- Registration: No
- Launched: 2008; 18 years ago
- Current status: Inactive

The 405 was an independent online magazine based in London, operating from 2008 to 2019, concentrating on music and popular culture. It reported primarily on independent music, film, art, technology and fashion.

== History ==
The 405 was founded in 2008 by Oliver Primus, who remained the editor until the site closed down, and its first article was published on 28 April 2008. The webzine's name derives from a song on Death Cab For Cutie's album We Have the Facts and We're Voting Yes, which itself is a reference to I-405 in Seattle, Washington.

The webzine published independent music reviews, features and interviews. It also published music premieres, exclusive live performances, podcasts, and playlists.

The 405 has partnered with festivals such as Green Man, Iceland Airwaves and Le Guess Who?.

== Recognition ==
It has been recognised by a number of publications such as the BBC, Clash, The Daily Telegraph, The Guardian, Pitchfork, Stereogum, The Independent and NME.

The 405 closed down on 30 November 2019.
