= Dandelion Radio =

Internet radio station

Dandelion Radio is an internet radio station founded in June 2006 with the aim of pursuing the musical legacy of the popular and influential BBC Radio 1 disc jockey John Peel. The station takes its name from the record label Dandelion Records founded and run by Peel between 1969 and 1972.

In November 2006 Dandelion Radio was asked by Peel's former production team at BBC Radio 1 to take over the running of the annual Festive Fifty listeners' chart of that year's releases. Radio 1 DJs Huw Stephens and Rob da Bank broadcast notice of the move to Dandelion Radio during their One Music shows. The 2006 Festive Fifty was broadcast on Dandelion Radio in January 2007. During Christmas week 2007 and the subsequent January 2008, Dandelion Radio continued the Festive Fifty for 2007.

Dandelion Radio is funded by the DJs and backroom staff who contribute their time on a voluntary basis. The rolling schedule is renewed on the first day of every calendar month. Shows include exclusively commissioned sessions and live sets from both new and established artists, including Frog, Benjamin Shaw, The Male Pattern, Christ., Jack Hayter, and others. The station's audio idents include contributions from many artists championed by Peel, including David Gedge, Half Man Half Biscuit and Jegsy Dodd.

== DJs involved in Dandelion Radio ==
The number of DJs involved in Dandelion Radio's schedules has been increasing steadily over time. The current line-up is: Andrew Morrison, from Portsmouth (who used to do the content warning jingles for John Peel), Dan Barrell, Radio Dubster (two Scottish DJs Stephen and Brian), Jeff Grainger, Katherine Godfrey, Marcelle van Hoof (a Dutch DJ), Mark Cunliffe, Mark Rosney, Mark Whitby, Matt Gunn, Matt Jones, Neil Jenkins, Paul Ackroyd, Pete Jackson, Peter Nelson, Rachael Neiman and Adam, Rocker (of The Flatmates), Sasser (a.k.a. SASR), Simon Higginbotham, Ste McCabe (queercore singer) and The Yank Sizzler (US DJ Michael Stoecker).
