= Frog (band) =

American indie rock band

- Daniel in 2026

Background information
- Origin: Queens, New York, U.S.
- Genres: Indie rock; alt-country; Americana; indie folk
- Years active: 2012–present
- Labels: Monkfish; Audio Antihero; Tapewormies
- Members: Daniel Bateman; Steve Bateman; Thomas White
- Website: frog.band

Frog is an American indie rock band. The group was founded by Daniel Bateman and Thomas White in Queens, New York in 2012. In 2019, White left the band and was replaced on drums by Bateman's brother Steve. White has since rejoined the band on bass.

== History ==
=== 2012–2023: Formation, up to Count Bateman and Hiatus ===
Daniel Bateman and Thomas White began playing together in the folk group Uncles, a collaboration between Bateman and songwriter Will Schwartz. Their self-titled debut album was released in 2013 by Monkfish Records.

UK-based Audio Antihero label released their second album Kind of Blah in 2015.

In January 2016, Frog toured England and Scotland to promote Kind of Blah. The tour was also filmed for the 2018 Kings of Blah documentary by Alex Coppola.

After Kind of Blah, Frog reissued their self-titled album through Audio Antihero and contributed a remix of Magana's “Golden Tongue” to the b-side of her “Inches Apart” single.

Frog followed Kind of Blah in November 2018 with Whatever We Probably Already Had It.

In 2019, White relocated to England making August's Count Bateman a solo album from Bateman. Frog then contributed a live version of “Rubbernecking” to the From the River to the Sea: The Terrible Truth About Palestine fundraiser compilation for the United Palestinian Appeal in 2021.

=== 2023–present: Return from Hiatus ===
Frog returned in November 2023 with their fifth album Grog, for which Steve Bateman formally joined as the band's drummer. The album's singles received support from Pitchfork and Stereogum while the album was included in Bandcamp Daily’s weekly “Essential Albums,” received 9/10 from God Is In The TV, and was graded 7.4 in a review by Pitchfork's Nina Corcoran.

Grog was the top debut in the North American College & Community Radio Chart. The “Maybelline” single was played by BBC Music Introducing, and Grog was the “Record of Note” on Hart's November 17, 2023 show. “U Shud Go 2 Me” was also added to the Amazing Radio playlist. To support the album, Bateman appeared on Roddy Hart's January 1, 2024 show as the “Me-in-3” guest.

In December 2024, Frog released the "DID SANTA COME" single, alongside an announcement for their sixth album, 1000 Variations on the Same Song, and North American tour.

The band returned in January 2025, with the "MIXTAPE LINER NOTES VAR. IV" single, and to announce a February 14 date for the new album. The following week, they released the "JUST USE YR HIPS VAR. VI" single before the "HOUSEBROKEN VAR. IV" on February 7.

On February 11, 2025, Stereogum named 1000 Variations on the Same Song as their "Album of the Week." The album was released on February 14. It was featured in Pitchfork's "11 New Albums You Should Listen to Now." In March, Frog entered the NACC 200 chart at #39, that week's top debut. They also recorded radio sessions for WFMU and KEXP.

Seven months later, Frog issued a new album, The Count, which was followed in April 2026 with Frog for Sale.

== Band members ==
Current members

- Daniel Bateman– vocals, guitars, piano, bass guitar, drums (2012–present)
- Thomas White - drums (2012–2019), bass (2025-present)
- Steve Bateman - drums, percussion, background vocals (2023-present)

== Discography ==
Albums and EPs

- Frog (Monkfish Records, 2013 / Audio Antihero, 2015)
- Kind of Blah (Audio Antihero, 2015)
- Whatever We Probably Already Had It (Audio Antihero, 2018)
- Count Bateman (Tapewormies / Audio Antihero, 2019)
- Grog (Tapewormies / Audio Antihero, 2023)
- 1000 Variations On The Same Song (Tapewormies / Audio Antihero, 2025)
- The Count (Tapewormies / Audio Antihero, 2025)
- Frog for Sale (Tapewormies / Audio Antihero, 2026)

Singles

- Judy Garland (Audio Antihero, 2015)
- Photograph (Audio Antihero, 2015)
- Catchyalater (Audio Antihero, 2015)
- Something to Hide (Audio Antihero, 2018)
- American (Audio Antihero, 2018)
- Bones (Audio Antihero, 2018)
- God Once Loved a Woman (Audio Antihero, 2019)
- Black Friday (Tapewormies / Audio Antihero, 2019)
- It’s Something I Do (Tapewormies / Audio Antihero, 2019)
- Black on Black on Black (Tapewormies / Audio Antihero, 2023)
- Maybelline (Tapewormies / Audio Antihero, 2023)
- New Ro (Tapewormies / Audio Antihero, 2023)
- DID SANTA COME (Tapewormies / Audio Antihero, 2024)
- MIXTAPE LINER NOTES VAR. VII (Tapewormies / Audio Antihero, 2025)
- JUST USE YOUR HIPS VAR.VI (Tapewormies / Audio Antihero, 2025)
- HOUSEBROKEN VAR. IV (Tapewormies / Audio Antihero, 2025)
- BITTEN BY MY LOVE VAR. XI (Tapewormies / Audio Antihero, 2025)
- SPANISH ARMADA VAR. XV (Tapewormies / Audio Antihero, 2025)
- SAX-A-MA-PHONE VAR. XII (Tapewormies / Audio Antihero, 2025)

Compilation appearances

- A Collective Sigh of Relief (Gold Flake Paint, 2013) – contributes "Arkansas"
- Elder Statesman: Nine Long Years of Audio Antihero Records (Audio Antihero, 2019) – contributes "Judy Garland"
- Vinyl Post: Volume 6 (Vinyl Post, 2021) – contributes "Bones"
- From the River to the Sea: The Horrible Truth About Palestine - a Fundraiser for the United Palestinian Appeal (Audio Antihero, 2021) – contributes "Rubbernecking (Live in Edinburgh)"

Other credits

- Magana - Inches Apart (Audio Antihero, 2017) - Remixer (Track 2)
