= The Alternative (online magazine) =

Online music magazine

- Website type: Online magazine
- Available in: English
- Creator: Henderson Cole
- Editor: Henderson Cole (Managing Editor)
- Website: www.getalternative.com
- Launched: 2014; 12 years ago
- Current status: Active

The Alternative is an independent music and culture online magazine founded by entertainment lawyer Henderson Cole in 2014. It publishes independent music reviews, features, interviews, photography, Op-Eds, and coverage of other media.

== History ==
Originally started as a college radio show in 2009, The Alternative website was founded by Henderson Cole in 2014 with additional editors, writers and photographers joining in subsequent years, including Zac Djamoos, Hugo Reyes, Keegan Bradford, and Molly Mary O'Brien.

The site's mission statement shares the goals to "promote the best music possible" and "to speak out on important issues."

In 2017, The Alternative began booking shows, including an unofficial SXSW showcase featuring Kississippi, Strange Ranger, Mom Jeans, among others. In 2019, The Alternative and The Grey Estates co-booked the Pitt Gets Alternative festival, with Wild Pink, Stef Chura, and local artists.

In 2018, they partnered with the AGL Sounds to record live performance sessions with artists including Hurry, Greet Death, and Well Wisher, which were released via YouTube and their website, as well as Bandcamp through their in-house label. The Alternative also released The Alt's Best of 2018 Comp in February 2019, which included contributions from Sidney Gish, Pool Kids, Foxing, and raised funds for No More Dysphoria.

In 2021, Cole, the site's founder, now an entertainment lawyer, proposed the American Music Library, a government-run streaming service, with intentions of increasing artist royalty payment rates. In 2023, he spoke to TechCrunch, as well as KEXP and Slate the following year, about potential issues with AI generated music and the streaming. Cole also worked on the Living Wage for Musicians Act, which was introduced by Congresswoman Rashida Tlaib and Congressman Jamaal Bowman in 2024.

== Editorial ==
The Alternative's editorial is primarily focused on independent music releases, but has also covered mainstream releases, including Taylor Swift's The Life of a Showgirl in 2025.

The Alternative's output has included reviews, interviews, track-by-track album commentaries, a novella excerpt, and premieres.

In addition to their music and film related editorial, The Alternative has also published Op-Eds on social and political topics, such as "I’m a Muslim Immigrant and I’m Not Going Anywhere" and “DIY Ethics Can Fuel A Progressive Revolution.”

The Alternative's work has been referenced or cited by BrooklynVegan, WXPN, Pitchfork, Bust, Stereogum, Uproxx, Vox Media, The Daily Dot, The New York Times, Hanif Abdurraqib, FanSided, Her Campus, Chicago Reader, Texan News Network, WBUR, BlowUpRadio, Forbes, Columbia Journalism Review, Audacy, NJ.com, Sputnik Music, and others.
