= Florence (album) =

Studio album by Darren Hayman
- Released: 6 November 2015
- Recorded: Florence, Italy; 21 December 2014 - 1 January 2015
- Genre: Indie rock
- Length: 34:46
- Label: Fika Recordings
- Producer: Darren Hayman

Darren Hayman chronology
Chants for Socialists (2015)	Florence (2015)	Thankful Villages Volume 1 (2016)

Florence is the thirteenth solo studio album by British singer/songwriter Darren Hayman. It was released by Fika Recordings on 6 November 2015.

== Background ==
Florence is Hayman's first solo album not to feature any other guest musicians. It is named after the Italian city of Florence where the album was written and recorded by Hayman whilst on holiday. Hayman was visiting Elizabeth Morris of Allo Darlin' and Ola Innset of Making Marks and recorded the album in their apartment.

Florence was released on vinyl and via digital download.

== Critical reception ==
Professional ratings
Aggregate scores
Source	Rating
Metacritic	74/100
Review scores
Source	Rating
Drowned in Sound	8/10
Folk Radio UK	Positive
The Line of Best Fit	8/10
musicOMH	4/5 stars
NME	3/5 stars
Record Collector	3/5 stars
The Skinny	3/5 stars

On the Metacritic website, which aggregates reviews from critics and assigns a normalised rating out of 100, Florence received a score of 74, based on 2 mixed and 4 positive reviews. Record Collector write that "Hayman’s lyrics, vocals and musicianship add up to a frequently touching whole" but feel that most of the songs are "full of potential" rather than being the finished article. The review by Folk Radio UK calls the album "one of his best surprises yet" describing the song arrangements as "uncluttered" and the album as "sad and muted". The Line of Best Fit calls Florence "another excellent addition to Darren Hayman’s sterling oeuvre", calling the lyrics "superb" and noting Hayman's "ever-observant eye for detail". The NME state that Florence "unfolds like a giant lullaby" in their review. musicOMH call Florence an album "of love and relationships", writing of album closer "The English Church" that, "like the rest of the album, it is full of understated charm and is quite, quite beautiful". Drowned in Sound write that "as a whole, Florence drifts at a sleepy pace – but a good sleepy, more a lullaby than a dirge", stating that the album is concerned with "finding grace in the prosaic, granting peace and grace to those that need it." The Skinny write that the album is "an open-hearted exercise in melancholy" but call it "a significant step down" from Hayman's Chants for Socialists album released earlier in the same year. The Guardian called it "the one album you should listen to this week," adding "It brings together the threads that tie together Hayman’s previous work and confirms him as a skilful lyricist and a great English artist."

== Track listing ==
All tracks written by Darren Hayman

Side one

1. "Nuns Run the Apothecary" – 4:03
2. "Break Up With Him" – 4:16
3. "From the Square to the Hill" – 3:47
4. "When You’re Lonely, Don’t Be" – 3:03
5. "On the Outside" – 2:32

Side two

7. "Didn’t I Say Don’t Fall In Love With Him" – 4:24
8. "Lose Me and Find Me" – 2:46
9. "Post Office Girl" – 3:09
10. "Safe Fall" – 3:21
11. "The English Church" – 3:24

== Personnel ==
- Darren Hayman — all instruments and vocals
