= We Come from the Same Place =

Studio album by Allo Darlin'
- Released: 6 October 2014
- Recorded: Soup Studios (London), Summer 2013
- Genre: Indie pop
- Length: 39:53
- Labels: Fortuna Pop! (UK); Slumberland Records (US)
- Producer: Simon Trought

Allo Darlin' chronology
Europe (2012)	We Come from the Same Place (2014)	Bright Nights (2025)

We Come from the Same Place is the third studio album by indie band Allo Darlin'. It was released by Fortuna Pop! Records on 6 October 2014 in the UK and by Slumberland Records on 7 October 2014 in the US. It received mostly positive reviews, with critics noting the songwriting of Elizabeth Morris and the vocals and guitar work of Paul Rains.

== Background ==
We Come from the Same Place is the third album by London-based Anglo-Australian indie band Allo Darlin'. It is the first recording from the band since singer Elizabeth Morris moved to Florence, Italy, whilst the rest of the band members remained in London. Morris moved when her husband found employment in Italy. While the band logistics were affected by the move, it did not cause any real issues. "It's really doable, and for me, the difference in my quality of life and how much I'm enjoying life is so worth it", Morris said. Around the same time, Morris also released Optimism, a solo four track EP recorded with help from English singer-songwriter and guitarist Darren Hayman.

In 2013, the band rehearsed the songs for the album during a tour of small venues in London. "We had the idea that it would be great to road-test the new songs before we put them to tape," Morris announced. The album was recorded mostly live that same summer at Soup Studios in London, with minimal overdubs. The production resulted in a grittier sound than previous albums by the band. Simon Trought, who produced their debut album Allo Darlin' (2010), returned to produce this album.

We Come from the Same Place was released on vinyl and CD, as well as via digital download, with liner notes written by Darren Hayman.

== Critical reception ==
Professional ratings
Aggregate scores
Source	Rating
AnyDecentMusic?	7.0/10
Metacritic	75/100
Review scores
Source	Rating
AllMusic	4/5 stars
Consequence of Sound	B
Cuepoint (Expert Witness)	A−
Drowned in Sound	8/10
Exclaim!	7/10
MusicOMH	4/5 stars
Pitchfork	7.2/10
PopMatters	9/10
Rolling Stone	2.5/5 stars
Uncut	7/10

On the Metacritic website, which aggregates reviews from critics and assigns a normalised rating out of 100, We Come from the Same Place received a score of 75, based on 3 mixed and 9 positive reviews.

Helen Clarke of musicOMH called the album the band's best release to date, describing it as a "polished" mixture of the previous two albums, with "a healthy dose of upbeat, indie disco tracks...alongside the more introspective, woozy songs that dominated Europe".

Music critic Jamieson Cox of Pitchfork found the strengths of the album in Morris' songwriting and storytelling, and the band's no-nonsense arrangements, pointing to the song "Angela" as one of the highlights of the album. However, Cox criticised the album when it "slips away from real emotional impact into more cloying and saccharine territory", such as in the songs "Bright Eyes" and "Heartbeat".

Writing for Exclaim!, Melody Lau expressed approval of Morris' songwriting and detailed lyrics that keep the interest of the audience. Similarly, Zac Coe in CMJ commends Morris' work as a lyricist, pointing to the song "Crickets in the Rain" as one of the best examples of her work on the album.

Critic Philip Cosores of Consequence of Sound argues that "History Lessons" and "We Come from the Same Place" are two of the best tracks on the album. "History Lessons", according to Cosores, is one of the best songs Morris has ever written up to this point: a "spare, beautiful masterpiece". Sophie Weiner of Rolling Stone, also pointed to "History Lessons" as the highlight track of the album, and while she found the album "pleasant" overall, she felt it was too steeped in nostalgia, leaving it "unmemorable".

In a review for AllMusic, Tim Sendra notes the vocals of guitarist Paul Rains on "Bright Eyes" and his overall contributions as a guitarist. Matthew Slaughter of Drowned in Sound also praised the guitar work of Paul Rains, particularly on tracks like "Heartbeat" and "Another Year".

In a glowing review of the album for PopMatters, John Paul notes that the band has grown musically and lyrically, and that the recording demonstrates a more assertive group that is willing to take risks.

== Track listing ==
All songs written by Allo Darlin'

1. "Heartbeat" – 3:30
2. "Kings and Queens" – 2:57
3. "We Come from the Same Place" – 4:37
4. "Angela" – 3:24
5. "Bright Eyes" – 3:22
6. "History Lessons" – 4:05
7. "Half Heart Necklace" – 3:02
8. "Romance and Adventure" – 2:51
9. "Crickets in the Rain" – 3:40
10. "Santa Maria Novella" – 3:59
11. "Another Year" – 4:26

== Personnel ==
- Elizabeth Morris – vocals, ukulele, guitar
- Paul Rains – vocals, guitar, lapsteel
- Bill Botting – vocals, bass guitar, acoustic guitar
- Mike Collins – drums, percussion
