= January Songs =

Album by Darren Hayman

Studio album by Darren Hayman
- Released: 2011
- Recorded: January 2011
- Genres: Folk rock, Indie rock
- Length: 1:40:42
- Label: Belka
- Producer: Darren Hayman

Darren Hayman chronology
Essex Arms (2010)	January Songs (2011)	The Ship's Piano (2011)

January Songs is a compilation album by British singer-songwriter Darren Hayman. The collection is compiled from a one-month project undertaken by Hayman whereby each song was written, recorded and released throughout January 2011, accompanied by a music video and video diaries.

Collaborators included The Wave Pictures, Elizabeth Morris, Gordon McIntyre from Ballboy, Terry Edwards, DJ Downfall, Rotifer, Valentine Leys, Litoral, The Hillfields, Ghostwriter, Pete Astor, Harvey Williams and fellow Hefner alumni Jack Hayter and Antony Harding.

A special anniversary physical release of the album was released in January 2012. A limited edition of 1500 came with sleeves individually hand-drawn by Hayman. The album was launched with two shows at The Hideaway in London with support from Benjamin Shaw and Pete Astor.

The album also comes with 17 hidden tracks of demos and voice notes not available on the original conception.

== Critical Reception ==
The 2012 collected edition received 4/5 from Record Collector, 8/10 from musicOMH, and 7/10 from Drowned in Sound. It also received a positive review in The Sunday Times from Stewart Lee.

== Track listing ==
1. "It Was Over" – 2:36
2. "Bad Technology" – 3:24
3. "We're Staying In" – 2:52
4. "Isle of Eigg" (Sung by Gordon McIntyre) – 2:58
5. "Hold Back the Clock" – 2:02
6. "Nothing at All" (Recorded live at The Lexington) – 2:01
7. "Esplanade Drive" – 3:04
8. "Old Man Hands" (With Terry Edwards) – 2:49
9. "I Can't Control Myself" (Produced by DJ Downfall) – 3:33
10. "I Know I Fucked Up" (With Elizabeth Morris) – 3:28
11. "You Can't Tell Her Anything" (Recorded live at Resonance FM) – 2:54
12. "My Bedroom" – 2:37
13. "My Dirty Widow" – 3:27
14. "Who Hung the Monkey?" (With The Wave Pictures) – 3:32
15. "Britain in Bloom" (With Rotifer) – 2:49
16. "Let Me Sleep" (With Jack Hayter) – 3:43
17. "Arthur the Dog" – 2:57
18. "The Return" – 4:09
19. "No Different for Girls" (Sung by Valentine Leys) – 3:14
20. "I Want to Be a Volunteer" – 4:28
21. "Shh... (With Litoral) – 4:21
22. "Baby, Be Good to Me" – 2:31
23. "Bad, Bad, Bad, Bad Girl" (With The Hillfields) – 2:49
24. "Ventriloquism" (With Ghostwriter) – 3:06
25. "Forest Blues" (With Pete Astor) – 3:08
26. "Let Out the Sides" – 3:46
27. "I Can Keep a Secret" (With Harvey Williams) – 3:58
28. I Won the Girl" (Sung by Antony Harding) – 3:24
29. "My Miniature Band" – 3:47
30. "We're Tired of Getting Dicked Around" (Recorded live at The Lexington) – 4:14
31. "My Dream Train" – 2:58
