= The Birds Sing Goodnight to You and Me =

Studio album by ANT
- Released: 26 March 2012
- Recorded: Barkarby Sweden Walthamstow London
- Genre: Folk indie acoustic
- Label: We Were Never Being Boring collective
- Producer: Antony Harding Darren Hayman

ANT chronology
Footprints Through the Snow (2006)	The Birds Sing Goodnight to You and Me (2012)

The Birds Sing Goodnight to You and Me is the 2012 full-length album by ANT, singer songwriter Antony Harding.

== Track listing ==
1. "Kisses on a Plate"
2. "Black Swans on the Water"
3. "Hand-Me-Downs"
4. "Such a Pretty Sight"
5. "Lady Grey"
6. "Somewhere Quiet We Could Go"
7. "Up on the Downs"
8. "When the Robin Spreads His Wings & Sings"
9. "Fireworks in This Small Town Tonight"
10. "Oh What a Day (Oh What a Night)"

== Background ==
A bird-themed album, it was recorded in the spring of 2011 by Antony Harding at home in Barkarby Sweden and Darren Hayman in Walthamstow London, England. Mixed by Darren Hayman in London 2011. Additional recordings by Suzanne Rhatigan, Jack Hayter and John Morrison. It was released 26 March 2012 on We Were Never Being Boring Collective (ITALY).

== Musicians ==
- Darren Hayman - bass guitar, piano, electric guitar, Wurlitzer piano, fake strings, backing vocals
- Antony Harding - acoustic guitars, electric guitar, drums, conga drums, percussion, vocals, bass, harmonica, mandolin, piano
- James Milne - bass guitar (01) (05)
- Jack Hayter - pedal steel, viola (09)
- Suzanne Rhatigan - Wurlitzer piano, backing vocals (10)
- John Morrison - synths, radio noises (06)
- Dave Watkins - banjo (09)

== Press quotes ==
- "The sweep of these songs is breathtaking - best album of 2012" – Mark Whitby (Dandelion Radio).
- "Charming, intimate & sweetly melodic - singer-songwriter of snowflake delicate indie-pop" - SoundsXP.
- "Enduring songs for the hopelessly romantic and romantically hopeless" - Goldflake Paint.
- "Easy shuffly folky rhythms with the loveliest of melodies - contains some of his best work to date - this is where he takes flight" - SoundsXP.
- "A small stroke of lightning in the merciless hot summer" - INDIE FOR BUNNIES.
- "An album of such unabashed simplicity that its excellence and originality seem barely feasible. Medium and message merge to produce a simplicity that is devastating" - Mark Whitby (Dandelion Radio).
- "Lovely British boy-with-a-guitar lullabies" – SONGS ILLINOIS.NET.
