= The Ship's Piano =

Studio album by Darren Hayman
- Released: 2011
- Genre: Folk rock, indie rock
- Label: Fortuna Pop!

Darren Hayman chronology
January Songs (2011)	The Ship's Piano (2011)	The Green and the Grey (2011)

Professional ratings
Review scores
Source	Rating
DIY	4/5 stars
Drowned in Sound	7/10

The Ship's Piano is a studio album by British singer-songwriter Darren Hayman. It was released by Fortuna Pop! in 2011.

A French piano built in 1933 is the only instrument employed on the album.

== Critical reception ==
In a 7/10 review, Drowned in Sound wrote that "if [Hayman]'s not yet unanimously considered the greatest cardigan-stylee speccy-sporting dweeby loser type songwriter-man of recent decades, he's surely on his miserable, merry way. The BBC called it "Uniquely intimate and very satisfying fare from the ex-Hefner man." It was also praised by The Line of Best Fit, Clash Music, The Quietus, and others.

== Track listing ==
1. "I Taught You How To Dance" – 3:23
2. "Old House" – 4:44
3. "Cuckoo" – 3:59
4. "It's Easy to Hang With You" – 5:43
5. "Know Your Place" – 1:06
6. "Take a Breather" – 5:53
7. "Clown Sky" – 3:31
8. "No Children" – 4:31
9. "Oh Josephine" – 6:39
10. "Think It Through" – 3:44
11. "The Ship's Piano" – 3:47
