= Pram Town =

Studio album by Darren Hayman & the Secondary Modern
- Released: 2009
- Recorded: 2008
- Genre: Folk rock, indie rock
- Length: 52:31
- Label: The Track & Field Organisation

Darren Hayman & the Secondary Modern chronology
Darren Hayman & the Secondary Modern (2007)	Pram Town (2009)	Essex Arms (2010)

Professional ratings
Review scores
Source	Rating
Drowned in Sound	(7/10)
The Quietus	(favourable)

Pram Town is the third studio album by British singer-songwriter Darren Hayman and his second with his backing band the Secondary Modern. It was released by the Track & Field Organisation on 26 January 2009. Inspired by the town of Harlow, the album is the first part of his "Essex Trilogy," and was described by Hayman as "A Folk Opera."

== Track listing ==
1. "Civic Pride" – 2:30
2. "Pram Town" – 2:55
3. "Compilation Cassette" – 3:39
4. "Losing My Glue" – 3:06
5. "No Middle Name" – 3:26
6. "Room to Grow" – 3:21
7. "Our Favourite Motorway" – 4:36
8. "Out of My League" – 4:29
9. "Amy and Rachel" – 4:02
10. "Fire Stairs" – 4:41
11. "Leaves on the Line" – 3:58
12. "High Rise Towers in Medium Size Towns" – 4:30
13. "Never Want to be That Way Again" – 3:00
14. "Big Fish" – 4:25
