= Europe (Allo Darlin' album) =

Studio album by Allo Darlin'
- Released: May 2012
- Genre: Indie pop
- Length: 39:54
- Label: Fortuna Pop!; Slumberland
- Producer: Simon Trought

Allo Darlin' chronology
Allo Darlin' (2010)	Europe (2012)	We Come from the Same Place (2014)

Singles from Europe
- 1. "Capricornia" Released: 2012; 2. "Northern Lights" Released: 2012; 3. "Europe" Released: 2012

Europe is the second full-length album from the London indie pop group Allo Darlin'. The album was released in May 2012 by Fortuna Pop! in the United Kingdom and Slumberland Records in the United States.

== Reception ==
Professional ratings
Aggregate scores
Source	Rating
AnyDecentMusic?	7.4/10
Metacritic	82/100
Review scores
Source	Rating
AllMusic	4/5 stars
The A.V. Club	B
The Boston Phoenix	3.5/4 stars
MSN Music (Expert Witness)	A−
NME	8/10
Pitchfork	8.1/10
PopMatters	9/10
Rolling Stone	4/5 stars
Spin	8/10
Uncut	7/10

At Metacritic, which assigns a weighted average rating out of 100 to reviews from mainstream critics, Europe received an average score of 82, which indicates "universal acclaim", based on reviews from 18 critics. Europe was also tallied by Metacritic as the 32nd best reviewed album of 2012 by the end of the year by mainstream critics.

The album was listed at number 42 on Rolling Stone's list of the top 50 albums of 2012.

== Track listing ==
1. "Neil Armstrong" – 3:34
2. "Capricornia" – 4:31
3. "Europe" – 3:55
4. "Some People Say" – 3:43
5. "Northern Lights" – 3:06
6. "Wonderland" – 3:34
7. "Tallulah" – 4:48
8. "The Letter" – 4:03
9. "Still Young" – 4:52
10. "My Sweet Friend" – 3:49

== Personnel ==
- Elizabeth Morris – guitar, ukulele, vocals
- Michael Collins – drums, vocals
- Paul Rains – guitar, lap steel guitar, vocals
- Bill Botting – bass, vocals
