= Darren Hayman & the Secondary Modern (album) =

Studio album by Darren Hayman & the Secondary Modern
- Released: 2007
- Genres: Folk rock, Indie rock
- Length: 43:04
- Label: The Track & Field Organisation

Darren Hayman & the Secondary Modern chronology
Table for One (2006)	Darren Hayman & the Secondary Modern (2007)	Pram Town (2009)

Darren Hayman & the Secondary Modern is the second studio album by British singer-songwriter Darren Hayman, following his departures from Hefner and The French. It is his first with his backing band the Secondary Modern. It was released by The Track & Field Organisation in 2007.

== Track listing ==
1. "Art and Design" – 4:45
2. "Rochelle" – 3:04
3. "Elizabeth Duke" – 3:31
4. "Straight Faced Tracy" – 3:09
5. "The Pupil Most Likely" – 3:42
6. "Let's Go Stealing" – 3:41
7. "Higgins Vs Reardon" – 4:23
8. "The Crocodile" – 3:14
9. "She's Not For Me" – 3:20
10. "The Wrong Thing" – 2:57
11. "Apologise" – 4:08
12. "Nothing in the Letter" – 3:16
