= Bright Nights (album) =

Studio album by Allo Darlin'
- Released: 11 July 2025
- Studio: Globus, Oslo, Norway; Big Jelly, Ramsgate, UK
- Length: 32:49
- Label: Fika; Slumberland
- Producer: Mike Collins

Allo Darlin' chronology
| We Come from the Same Place (2014) | Bright Nights (2025) |

Singles from Bright Nights
- 1. "Tricky Questions" Released: 2 April 2025; 2. "My Love Will Bring You Home" Released: 7 May 2025; 3. "Cologne" Released: 4 June 2025

Bright Nights is the fourth studio album by British indie pop band Allo Darlin'. It was released on via Fika Recordings in the United Kingdom and Slumberland Records in North America, in vinyl, CD and digital formats.

== Background ==
Released over a decade after the band's previous album, Bright Nights was described by the band's vocalist Elizabeth Innset as "an album from the heart, dealing with themes of love, birth and death, which are things we reflect more on than we did when we made our first album." Encompassing elements of folk, classic pop, and country music, The first single, "Tricky Questions", was released on 2 April 2025. "My Love Will Bring You Home" was released as the second single on 7 May 2025.

== Reception ==
Professional ratings
Review scores
| Source | Rating |
|---|---|
| AllMusic | 4/5 stars |
| The Skinny | 4/5 stars |

The album received a four-star rating from AllMusic, whose reviewer Marcy Donelson noted, "Drawing on emotional experiences from the preceding ten years, the LP may be a bit more reflective in nature than their previous releases, but fans can take heart that otherwise, it's like they never left".

Tara Hepburn of the Skinny assigned Bright Nights a rating of four stars and referred to it as "a soft-focus portrait of love through the years, from the youthful wonder of possibility, to heartbreak, to deep life-long companionship."

== Track listing ==
All lyrics are written by Elizabeth Morris, except "You Don't Think of Me At All" (lyrics by Bill Botting); all music is composed by Allo Darlin'.

| No. | Title | Length |
|---|---|---|
| 1. | "Leaves in the Spring" | 3:21 |
| 2. | "Tricky Questions" | 3:40 |
| 3. | "My Love Will Bring You Home" | 3:17 |
| 4. | "Northern Waters" | 3:51 |
| 5. | "You Don't Think of Me at All" | 3:07 |
| 6. | "Historic Times" | 3:11 |
| 7. | "Cologne" | 3:14 |
| 8. | "Stars" | 3:19 |
| 9. | "Slow Motion" | 2:24 |
| 10. | "Bright Nights" | 3:25 |
| Total length: | | 32:49 |

== Personnel ==
Credits adapted from Bandcamp.

=== Allo Darlin' ===
- Elizabeth Morris – vocals, guitar, ukulele
- Bill Botting – bass, vocals, guitar, piano
- Mike Collins – drums, percussion, guitar, Hammond, piano, synthesizer, engineering, mixing, production
- Paul Rains – electric guitar, sleeve art

=== Additional contributors ===
- Dan Mayfield – violin
- Heather Larimer – vocals
- Hannah Winter – vocals
- Laura Kovic – vocals
- Michael Donovan – mandolin
- Spike Wright – assistant engineering
- Javier Roldon Bermejo – mastering
- Jørgen Nordby – photography

== Charts ==
Chart performance for Bright Nights
| Chart (2025) | Peak position |
|---|---|
| UK Album Downloads (OCC) | 31 |
| UK Folk Albums (OCC) | 9 |
| UK Independent Albums (OCC) | 42 |
| UK Record Store (OCC) | 27 |
