= Table for One =

Studio album by Darren Hayman
- Released: 2006
- Genre: Folk rock, Indie rock
- Length: 50:28
- Label: The Track & Field Organisation

Darren Hayman chronology
Table for One (2006)	Darren Hayman & the Secondary Modern (2007)

Table for One is the debut solo album by British singer-songwriter Darren Hayman. It was released by The Track & Field Organisation in 2006.It received a five-star review in The Guardian and 8/10 from Drowned in Sound.

The album's cover art and title track were inspired by Cafe Rodi in Walthamstow, London.

The song "Everything's Wrong All the Time" was re-recorded live with The Wave Pictures for 2009's Madrid album, "The National Canine Defence League" was re-recorded in 2014 for the Dog EP.

== Track listing ==
1. "Caravan Song" – 3:11
2. "The English Head" – 4:42
3. "Perfect Homes" – 3:33
4. "That's Not What She's Like" – 3:43
5. "Grey Hairs" – 3:44
6. "You Chose Me" – 4:11
7. "The National Canine Defence League" – 4:44
8. "The Protons and the Neutrons" – 3:52
9. "Doug Yule's Velvet Underground" – 5:40
10. "Everything's Wrong All the Time" – 3:59
11. "A Wasted Year" – 4:53
12. "Table for One" – 4:22
