= Essex Arms =

Studio album by Darren Hayman & the Secondary Modern
- Released: 2010
- Genre: Folk rock, indie rock
- Length: 50:43
- Label: Fortuna Pop!

Darren Hayman & the Secondary Modern chronology
Pram Town (2009)	Essex Arms (2010)	January Songs (2011)

Essex Arms ratings
Review scores
Source	Rating
AllMusic	3.5/5 stars
DIY	4/5 stars
Uncut	4/5 stars

Essex Arms is the fourth studio album by British singer-songwriter Darren Hayman, and his third with his regular backing band the Secondary Modern. It was released by Fortuna Pop! in 2010. It is the second part of his "Essex Trilogy". The album features a duet with Emma-Lee Moss (Emmy the Great). It received a companion album in 2011, The Green and The Grey, which featured outtakes from the Essex Arms sessions.

== Track listing ==
1. "Be Lonely" – 4:05
2. "Calling Out Your Name Again" – 4:17 (with Emma-Lee Moss)
3. "Two Tree Island" – 7:08
4. "Winter Makes You Want Me More" – 4:36
5. "Super Kings" – 3:06
6. "Cocoa Butter" – 3:24
7. "Dagenham Ford" – 4:08
8. "I'll Be Your Alibi" – 5:54
9. "Spiderman Beats Ironman" – 4:13
10. "Drive Too Fast" – 3:35
11. "Plastic and Steel" – 2:52
12. "Nothing You Can Do About It" – 3:30
