= The Violence (album) =

2012 studio album by Darren Hayman featuring The Long Parliament

Studio album by Darren Hayman featuring the Long Parliament
- Released: 5 November 2012
- Genre: Folk rock; indie rock
- Length: 73:33 (2012) / 97:36 (2026)
- Label: Fortuna Pop! (2012) / Audio Antihero (2026)

Darren Hayman chronology
| Lido (2012) | The Violence (2012) | Bugbears (2013) |

The Violence is a studio album by British singer and songwriter Darren Hayman featuring the backing band the Long Parliament. It was released on 5 November 2012 by Fortuna Pop! The Violence is the third and final part in Hayman's Essex Trilogy. An expanded reissue of the album was released in June 2026 as a co-release between Audio Antihero and Hayman's Belka imprint.

== Critical reception ==
Professional ratings
Aggregate scores
| Source | Rating |
|---|---|
| AnyDecentMusic? | 7.9/10 |
| Metacritic | 81/100 |
Review scores
| Source | Rating |
| DIY | 4.5/5 stars |
| Drowned in Sound | 8/10 |
| God Is in the TV | 4/10 |
| The Line of Best Fit | 7.5/10 |
| Mojo | 4/5 stars |
| MusicOMH | 5/5 stars |
| NME | 4/5 stars |
| Q | 3/5 stars |
| The Skinny | 3/5 stars |
| Uncut | 8/10 |

At Metacritic, which assigns a normalized rating out of 100 to reviews from mainstream critics, the album has an average score of 81 based on 9 reviews, indicating "universal acclaim". Marc Burrows of The Quietus wrote that "these are wonderful pop songs, each a compacted treasure of melody and heart."

Additional positive reviews came from Stewart Lee of The Sunday Times, BBC, The Skinny, Drowned in Sound, The Line of Best Fit, KLOF Magazine, DIY,God Is In the TV, NME, and others.

== Original 2012 track listing ==
The Violence track listing
| No. | Title | Length |
|---|---|---|
| 1. | "The Violence" | 4:13 |
| 2. | "Impossible Times" | 3:21 |
| 3. | "How Long Have You Been Frightened For?" | 4:46 |
| 4. | "We Are Not Evil" | 3:06 |
| 5. | "The She-Cavaliers" | 4:28 |
| 6. | "Elizabeth Clarke" | 3:57 |
| 7. | "Vinegar Tom" | 5:14 |
| 8. | "Parliament Joan" | 4:51 |
| 9. | "The Word and the Word Alone" | 4:10 |
| 10. | "I Will Hide Away" | 3:30 |
| 11. | "When the King Enjoys His Own Again" | 1:19 |
| 12. | "Henrietta Maria" | 3:33 |
| 13. | "A Dogge Called Boye" | 1:37 |
| 14. | "Outsiders" | 1:18 |
| 15. | "Athur Wilson's Reverie" | 4:13 |
| 16. | "Rebecca West" | 4:33 |
| 17. | "Desire Lines" | 4:56 |
| 18. | "Kill the King" | 4:50 |
| 19. | "A Coffin for King Charles, a Crown for Cromwell and a Pit for the People" | 1:44 |
| 20. | "The Laughing Tree" | 3:55 |
| Total length: | | 73:33 |

== 2026 Expanded Edition track listing ==
The Violence track listing
| No. | Title | Length |
|---|---|---|
| 1. | "The Violence" | 4:13 |
| 2. | "Impossible Times" | 3:21 |
| 3. | "How Long Have You Been Frightened For?" | 4:46 |
| 4. | "We Are Not Evil" | 3:06 |
| 5. | "The She-Cavaliers" | 4:28 |
| 6. | "Elizabeth Clarke" | 3:57 |
| 7. | "Vinegar Tom" | 5:14 |
| 8. | "Parliament Joan" | 4:51 |
| 9. | "The Word and the Word Alone" | 4:10 |
| 10. | "I Will Hide Away" | 3:30 |
| 11. | "When the King Enjoys His Own Again" | 1:19 |
| 12. | "Henrietta Maria" | 3:33 |
| 13. | "A Dogge Called Boye" | 1:37 |
| 14. | "Outsiders" | 1:18 |
| 15. | "Athur Wilson's Reverie" | 4:13 |
| 16. | "Rebecca West" | 4:33 |
| 17. | "Desire Lines" | 4:56 |
| 18. | "Kill the King" | 4:50 |
| 19. | "A Coffin for King Charles, a Crown for Cromwell and a Pit for the People" | 1:44 |
| 20. | "The Laughing Tree" | 3:55 |
| 21. | "Queen of Misrule (Unreleased)" | 3:00 |
| 22. | "Lamenting Lady's Last Farewell to the World (Outtake)" | 2:38 |
| 23. | "The Smiling Tree (Unreleased)" | 4:40 |
| 24. | "The Violence (Demo)" | 3:24 |
| 25. | "We Are Not Evil (Demo)" | 2:22 |
| 26. | "Desire Lines (Demo)" | 4:40 |
| 27. | "The Laughing Tree (Demo)" | 3:18 |
| Total length: | | 97:36 |
