= Bugbear (disambiguation) =

A bugbear is a legendary creature, comparable to the Bogeyman.

Bugbear may refer to:

- Bugbear Entertainment, a Finnish video game company
- Bugbears (album), an album by Darren Hayman
- The Bugbears (c. 1561), an English play
