= You Might Be Smiling Now... =

Studio album by The Just Joans
- Released: 1 December 2017
- Genre: Indie pop
- Length: 39:15
- Label: Fika Recordings
- Producer: The Just Joans

The Just Joans chronology
6.9 Love Songs (2019)	You Might Be Smiling Now... (2017)	The Private Memoirs and Confessions of The Just Joans (2020)

Singles from You Might Be Smiling Now...
- 1. "No Longer Young Enough/Breakfast For Our Tea " Released: 28 July 2017

You Might Be Smiling Now... is the third studio album by Scottish indie pop group The Just Joans. It was released on 1 December 2017 by Fika Recordings. Their first full-length album in five years and first release in four, You Might Be Smiling Now... has been described as "a loose concept album [which details] the confusion of singer-songwriter David Pope’s teenage years, the horror of his twenties and the terror of his encroaching middle age".

== Track listing ==
No.	Title	Length
1.	"O Caledonia"	3:41
2.	"Steal the Keys (1996 Tears)"	2:48
3.	"Johnny, Have You Come Lately?"	3:01
4.	"A Matter of Time"	2:40
5.	"You Make Me Physically Sick (Let's Start having Children)"	3:09
6.	"I Only Smoke When I Drink"	4:40
7.	"No Longer Young Enough"	4:31
8.	"Someone Else That You Like More Than Me"	2:45
9.	"Read In Public Places"	2:39
10.	"Big Blue Moon"	4:07
11.	"Biblically Speaking"	2:40
12.	"Sleeperbloke"	2:39
Total length:		39:15
