= The Just Joans =

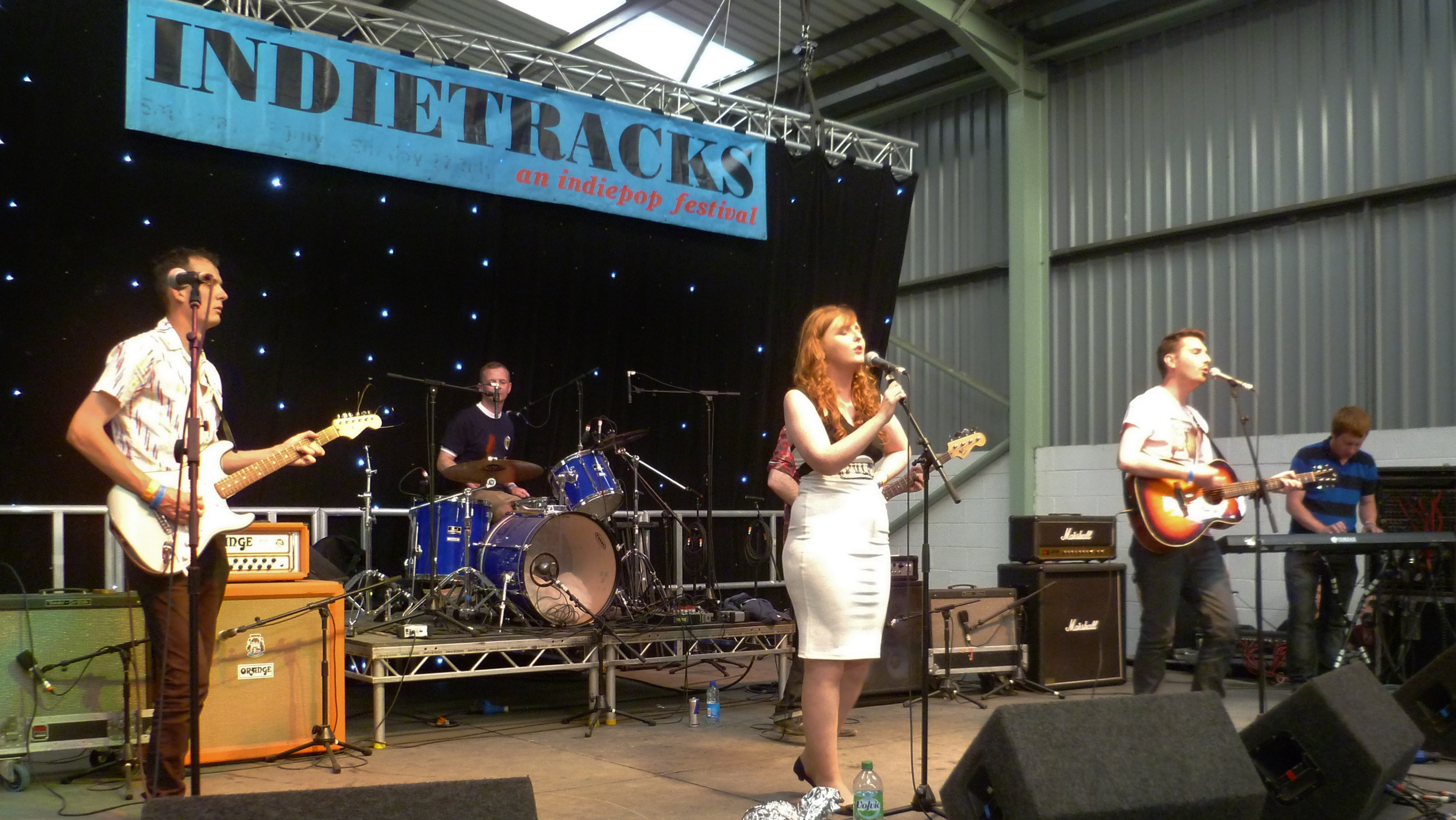
- The Just Joans in 2014

Background information
- Origin: Glasgow, Scotland
- Genres: Indie pop; alternative
- Years active: 2005–present
- Labels: Fika Recordings; WeePOP! Records; Ivan Lendil Music
- Members: David Pope; Katie Pope; Chris Elkin; Fraser Ford; Arion Xenos; Jason Sweeney
- Past members: Douglas Cameron; Rowan Smith; Allan Whyte; Kevin Brown; Kevin Carroll
- Website: www.thejustjoans.co.uk

The Just Joans are a Scottish indie pop band formed in Glasgow in 2005. Fronted by siblings David Pope (guitars, vocals, songwriting) and Katie Pope (vocals, artwork), the band gained cult popularity for their "acerbic yet winsome Scottish indiepop". Initially a bedroom lo-fi recording project, David Pope in time enlisted more members to expand the recorded sound and to take the music live.

== History ==
Naming the project 'The Just Joans', after Daily Record agony aunt Joan Burnie's ‘Just Joan’ column, David Pope began to work on a number of self-recorded tracks at home around 2005. This eventually led to the release of Last Tango in Motherwell in 2006. The album was initially self-released on cassette to a small number of friends, among these Chris Gilmour who decided to establish his own label, Ivan Lendil Music to release a CD version of the album. Guitarist Chris Elkin was enlisted after meeting David . The two played their first gig as The Just Joans in early 2006 in Glasgow's Tchai-Ovna. Later, David's sister, Katie would be added to sing harmonies and leads, as well as Fraser Ford on bass. The band would progress to record a series of EPs in the intervening years, mainly in Fraser Ford's bedroom, with a few lineup changes. However, the original four-piece would remain the same for this time. In 2008 The Just Joans made their debut at Indietracks festival, a crucial live platform for the band and where they have garnered legendary status.

In 2012 the band released the album Buckfast Bottles In The Rain. Their penultimate release for WeePOP! Records, the album was in some way a reimagining of their debut from 2005, with an altered tracklisting. Speaking for is this music?, Stuart McHugh wrote, "roughly a concept album of the years between the last days of school and the crushing reality of being a ‘grown up’ in the west of Scotland"

After releasing 6.9 Love Songs in August 2013, the band took a break and reconvened in 2017 for the release of You Might Be Smiling Now, their debut on Fika Recordings. With new drummer, Jason Sweeney added to the lineup the album marked a progression in sound with more synthesisers included and tentative full band arrangements It was around this time that keyboardist Douglas Cameron left the band followed by the recruitment of multi-instrumentalist Arion Xenos. In 2018 the band played a short promotional tour in support of the album including a sold-out show at the Lexington in London. In January 2020 the band released The Private Memoirs and Confessions of The Just Joans, which marked another dynamic shift to a heavily full band orientated sound. The band rehearsed the songs over the course of a couple of months and recorded the album in early 2019.

== Style ==
The band's music has been described as "the missing link between The Magnetic Fields and The Proclaimers" and "Shambling indie pop in the vein of early Pastels, those home-recorded Belle & Sebastian efforts or the early Postcard singles". Appraising Romantic Visions of Scotland (2026), God Is in the TV drew comparisons to Belle & Sebastian, The Wedding Present and OMD.

== Discography ==
Studio albums

- Last Tango in Motherwell (2005, self-released/Ivan Lendil Music)
- Buckfast Bottles in The Rain (2012, WeePOP! Records)
- You Might Be Smiling Now... (2017, Fika Recordings)
- The Private Memoirs and Confessions of The Just Joans (2020, Fika Recordings)
- Romantic Visions of Scotland (2026, Fika Recordings)

EPs

- Virgin Lips (2007, Wee POP! Records)
- Hey Boy...You're Oh So Sensitive! (2008, Wee POP! Records)
- Love And Other Hideous Accidents (2009, Wee POP! Records)
- Your Pain is a Joke Next To Mines (2010, Wee POP! Records)
- Seasonal Greet (2010, Wee POP! Records)
- 6.9 Love Songs (2013, Wee POP! Records)

Singles

- "No Longer Young Enough" (2017, Fika Recordings)
- "Has Anybody Seen My Boy?" / "Who Does Susan Think She Is?" (2018, Fika Recordings)
- "Dear Diary, I Died Again Today" (2019, Fika Recordings)
- "The One I Loathe The Least" (2019, Fika Recordings)
- "Wee Guys (Bobby's Got a Punctured Lung)" (2019, Fika Recordings)
