= Zoobombs =

Japanese indie rock band

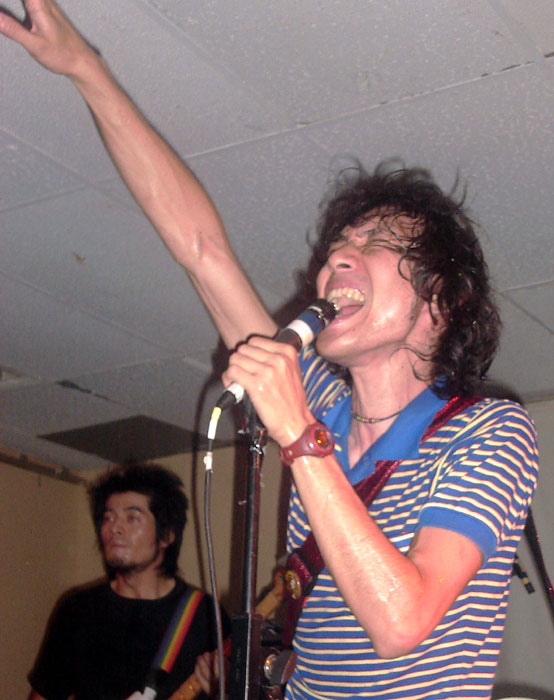
- Zoobombs performing at the 2005 Pop Montreal

Background information
- Origin: Tokyo, Japan
- Genres: Alternative rock; indie rock
- Years active: 1994–present
- Labels: Emperor Norton; We Are Busy Bodies; The Musebox; P572; ZBON-Sya; Donuts Worm
- Members: Don Matsuo; Matta; Reo Saikusa; Gak Ouchi
- Past members: Moostop; Bukka Billy; Atsushi; Piro; Pocky; Kim; Pitt; Mutch
- Website: thezoobombs.com

Zoobombs is a Japanese indie rock band, formed in Tokyo in 1994 by vocalist and guitarist Don Matsuo.

== History ==
The band formed in Tokyo in 1994, self-releasing four cassette albums. In 1999, the group signed to Virgin/EMI Japan where they released three albums. That year the band performed in Toronto as part of the Neon Palm Festival.

In 2013, the bassist in the group Moostop announced his desire to leave the group. Vocalist Don Matsuo stated that "I wasn’t really surprised, and knew that maybe this would happen one day, but I still wasn’t happy about his decision." The group did a tour and recorded a tour-only EP together. During this tour, the groups' drummer Pitt also announced his departure. Don Matsuo and his wife Matta began focus on a new group called The Randolf after this tour.

18 months after the group announced their departure, Matsuo reformed the group with Bukka Billy as their new drummer with a touring bass player.

== Style and influences ==
The band's funk-rock style is influenced by acts such as the Rolling Stones, Jimi Hendrix and Miles Davis.

== Members ==
Current members

- Don Matsuo – vocals, guitar
- Matta – vocals, keyboards
- Reo Saikusa – bass guitar
- Gak Ouchi – drums

Former members

- Moostop – bass guitar
- Bukka Billy - drums
- Atsushi – drums
- Piro – percussion
- Pocky – drums
- Kim – drums
- Pitt – drums
- Mutch - bass guitar

== Discography ==
=== Studio albums ===
- Super Funcy of Zbons (1997)
- Welcome Back Zoobombs! (1997)
- Let It Bomb (1998)
- Bomb Freak Express (1999)
- Dirty Bomb (2000)
- Love Is Funky (2002)
- New San Francisco (2004)
- Vamos a Bailar (2005)
- BBB (2006)
- The Sweet Passion (2012)
- Ice Cream & Dirt (2016)
- UMA LAND (2025)

=== Compilation albums ===
- Way In / Way Out (2006)
- Nightfriend of Zoobombs (2009)
- La Vie En Jupon (2011)
- The Best 1994-2024 (2024)

=== Live albums ===
- Bomb You Live (2001)
- Bear's Banquet: Live from Deep Night in Toronto (2007)
- Metamorythm (2009)
- The Wild Side Of The Moon (2018)
- Pink & Green (2019)

=== EPs ===
- Zoobombcrazy (2006)
- Midnightfriend of Zoobombs (2010)
- Agitation (2011)
- Cowboy Trumps (2012)
- On the Jungle (2013)
- Dirty Present (2015)

=== Singles ===
- "Bomb the Bomb" (1998)
- "Mo' Funky" (1998)
- "Hot Love" (1999)
- "Doo-Bee" (2000)
- "Jumbo" (2001)
- "Funky Movin'" (2002)
- "Colombie" (2005)
- "Pisces" (2005)
- Flaming Funky Lady (2025)
- Tropic (2025)
- Time of War (2025)
- My Favourites (2025)
