= P572 =

Canadian record label

- Founded: 2004
- Founder: Sam Murdock, Sebastien Leduc
- Genre: indie
- Country of origin: Canada
- Location: Quebec City, Quebec
- Official website: p572.com

P572 (pronounced P-five-seven-two) is a Canadian independent record label founded in 2004 in Quebec City by Sam Murdock and Sébastien Leduc.

To date, the label has released about a hundred albums including The Singularity, Phase I & II by Thisquietarmy (Eric Quach) and Away (Michel Langevin), 3/4 and Prospare by Arthur Comeau (Radio Radio), Songs for Harmonium and Drum Machine by Darren Hayman, Les années Monsieur by Keith Kouna, Désolé mouvement geste by Navet Confit as well as two books and several fanzines. Since 2012, several albums by the group Les Goules and Alaclair Ensemble as well as Darlène by Hubert Lenoir and Interbellum by NSA (with FanXoa (Bérurier Noir) and Madsaxx) have been reissued on vinyl in limited and numbered editions.

A France-Quebec collaboration has resulted in several co-releases with five French labels: Cattule & Ramón, Platinum Records, À tant rêver du roi, Club Teckel, Renegat Records and Ouch! Records. In Canada, some projects have been co-produced with the following record labels: 7e ciel, Simone Records, Label Obscura and Mutefakemusic. In December 2025, Zoobombs' twelfth album, UMA LAND, was released simultaneously in Canada, France (Ouch! Records), and Japan (ZBON-Sya).

In addition to his activities with P572, Sam Murdock works with Gabriel Pelletier (graphic designer) on the design of visuals for several artists (Jérôme 50, Claude Bégin, Paule-Andrée Cassidy, Kid Kouna, etc.) under the name Team Pochette. The duo won two Félix for the cover of the year with Alaclair Ensemble in 2017 and Koriass in 2019 at ADISQ.

The name P572 refers to Productions and the address where the label was founded: 572 rue Horatio-Nelson, St-Roch district, Québec.

== Artist roster ==
- (swedish) Death Polka
- Alaclair Ensemble
- Arlequin
- Arthur Comeau
- Black Taboo
- Build a Friend
- Christian Choquette
- Darren Hayman
- Docteur Culotte
- Don Matsuo
- Drahomira Song Orchestra
- Essertez
- Fabien Cloutier
- Fourche
- Jane Ehrhardt
- Les Goules
- Headache24
- Honey Pine Dresser
- HotKid
- Hubert Lenoir
- Joël Martel et les pépites d’or
- Juste Robert
- Keith Kouna
- Lesbo Vrouven
- L'orchestre d'hommes-orchestre
- Mathématique
- Millimetrik
- Navet Confit
- No Suicide Act (NSA)
- Oromocto Diamond
- Gab Paquet
- Princess & Murdock
- Qz45
- Rotting Ebitan
- Second Hand Virgin
- Sol Hess
- Sol Hess & the Boom Boom Doom Revue
- Sol Hess & the Sympatik's
- Sweat Like a Ape!
- Thisquietarmy X Away
- Tia Madrona
- Uberko
- VICE & V.I. STREET
- Dany Vohl
- Zoobombs

== See also ==
- List of Record Labels
