= Lido (Darren Hayman album) =

2012 studio album by Darren Hayman

Studio album by Darren Hayman
- Released: 2012
- Genre: Folk rock; indie rock
- Length: 49:27
- Label: Where It's at Is Where You Are

Darren Hayman chronology
The Green and the Grey (2011)	Lido (2012)	The Violence (2012)

Lido is a studio album by British singer and songwriter Darren Hayman. It was released through Where It's at Is Where You Are in 2012. It is an instrumental album, with field recordings, about public swimming pools. The field recordings used on the album were released in October 2012 as Lido Field Recordings.

Lido was reissued for Record Store Day in April 2023.

== Critical reception ==
Professional ratings
Review scores
Source	Rating
Drowned in Sound	8/10
Record Collector	4/5 stars

Stuart Huggett of The Quietus wrote that "even as a diversion from his lyrically focussed work, Lido adds to the developing picture of Hayman as a great chronicler of British life, present and past." Clay Pipe of Record Collector wrote that "while navigating the stylistic gamut from pop-reggae to piano études, by way of uke strums and jelly-like slide guitar, Hayman forsakes ambient drift for recurring tunefulness, thus providing some continuity with his song-based work." It was rated 8/10 by Drowned in Sound.

== Track listing ==
No.	Title	Length
1.	"London Fields"	3:01
2.	"Black Rock Baths"	3:59
3.	"Brockwell Park"	2:07
4.	"Parliament Hill"	4:55
5.	"Saltdean"	3:03
6.	"The Knap"	2:35
7.	"Super Swimming Stadium"	5:29
8.	"Brentwood"	4:45
9.	"Tinside"	3:31
10.	"Stonehaven"	4:36
11.	"King's Meadow"	1:39
12.	"Jubilee Pool"	2:57
13.	"Purley Way"	3:33
14.	"Tooting Bec"	3:17
Total length:		49:27
