= Allo Darlin' (album) =

Studio album by Allo Darlin'
- Released: June 7, 2010
- Recorded: 2010
- Genre: Twee pop
- Length: 37:26
- Label: Fortuna Pop!

Allo Darlin' chronology
Allo Darlin' (2010)	Europe (2012)

Allo Darlin' is the debut full-length from Allo Darlin'. It was released June 7, 2010 on Fortuna Pop!.

== Reception ==
Professional ratings
Aggregate scores
Source	Rating
AnyDecentMusic?	6.6/10
Metacritic	75/100
Review scores
Source	Rating
AllMusic	4/5 stars
Consequence of Sound	4/5 stars
MSN Music (Expert Witness)	A−
MusicOMH	4/5 stars
NME	5/10
Pitchfork	7.9/10
PopMatters	7/10
Uncut	3/5 stars

The AllMusic review by K. Ross Hoffman awarded the album 4 stars stating, "The playing is consistently strong and, with a few tender-hearted exceptions, briskly bouncy and grooving".

== Track listing ==
All tracks by Allo Darlin'

1. "Dreaming" – 3:22
2. "The Polaroid Song" – 4:14
3. "Silver Dollars" – 4:12
4. "Kiss Your Lips" – 3:46
5. "Heartbeat Chili" – 4:18
6. "If Loneliness Was Art" – 3:30
7. "Woody Allen" – 2:39
8. "Let's Go Swimming" – 4:31
9. "My Heart Is a Drummer" – 3:17
10. "What Will Be Will Be" – 3:37

== Personnel ==
- Elizabeth Morris – vocals, glockenspiel, handclapping, percussion, piano, ukulele,
- Paul Rains – electric guitar, backing vocals, fender rhodes, korg M1, lap steel guitar, omnichord
- Bill Botting – bass guitar, backing vocals, vocals
- Michael Collins – drums, backing vocals, percussion
- The Friday Night Choir – backing vocals
- Dan Mayfield – violin
- Monster Bobby – vocals
- Adam Nunn – mastering
- Keiron Phelan – flute
- Matthew Reynolds – backing vocals
- Simon Trought – backing vocals, engineer, handclapping, mandolin, mixing, percussion, producer
- Nik Vestberg – photography, sleeve design
