= The Butterflies of Love =

American indie pop band

- Also known as: Silver Bug, Bug
- Origin: New Haven, Connecticut, United States
- Genres: Indie, pop
- Years active: 1994-present
- Labels: Coffeehouse Records, Fortuna Pop!
- Members: Jason Mills; Peter Jackson Whitney; Neil O'Brien; Jeffrey Greene; Daniel Greene; Scott Amore
- Website: www.myspace.com/thebutterfliesoflove

The Butterflies of Love are an indie pop band from New Haven, Connecticut, United States.

The band was founded as "Silver Bug" (and then renamed "Bug") in the late 1990s by singer-songwriters Jeff Greene and Dan Greene (no relation, though they attended Hamilton College together), the Butterflies of Love have released two albums on US-based Coffeehouse Records and two albums on British independent label Fortuna Pop!. Their fifth single, "It's Different Now", was made Single of the Week in the NME.

== Discography ==
=== Singles/EPs ===
- I Read Her Diary b/w Dream World 1994 (under band's previous name, Bug) Coffeehouse Records (clear vinyl)
- Rob a Bank b/w Love May Be Possible 1996 Coffeehouse Records (blue sleeve)
- Wild b/w The Brain Service 1997 Secret 7 (UK) / Coffeehouse Records (USA)
- Rob a Bank b/w Drunken Falls 1998 Coffeehouse Records (green sleeve, nearly identical to 1996 single)
- It's Different Now
- Wintertime Queen (2000)
- The Mutation
- Dream Driver
- Orbit Around You (2006)

=== Albums ===
- America's Newest Hitmakers (1996)
- How to Know The Butterflies of Love (1999)
- The New Patient (2002)
- Famous Problems (2007)
