= Fightmilk =

English indie rock band

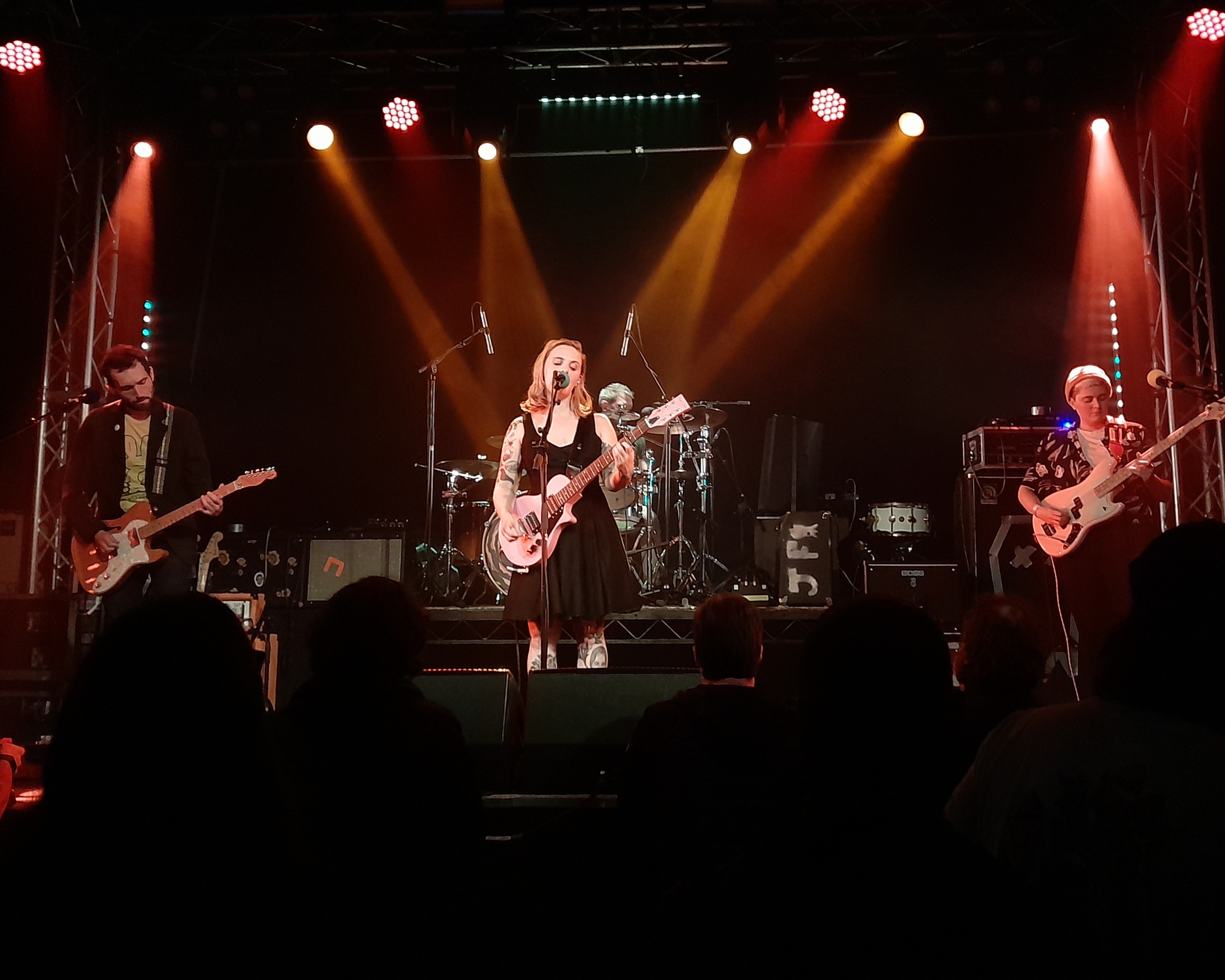
- Fightmilk at Tufnell Park Dome in London in 2021

Background information
- Origin: London, England
- Genres: Indie rock, Power pop
- Years active: 2015–present
- Labels: INH Records; Fika Recordings; Reckless Yes; Fierce Panda Records
- Members: Lily Rae; Alex Wisgard; Nick Kiddle; Healey Becks
- Past members: Adam Wainwright
- Website: https://fightmilkisaband.bandcamp.com

Fightmilk is an indie rock band from London, England. After releasing two EPs, the self-released The Curse of Fightmilk in 2016 and Pity Party on Fierce Panda in 2017. The band released their debut album Not With That Attitude with Reckless Yes in 2018 and their second album Contender, on the same label, in 2021. Their third album No Souvenirs was released with Fika Recordings and INH Records in 2024. Their output has been compared to Superchunk, Weezer, Kirsty MacColl, and Diet Cig.

== History ==
Fightmilk was formed in London in 2015 by Lily Rae (guitar and lead vocals), Alex Wisgard (guitar), Adam Wainwright (bass), and Nick Kiddle (drums).

The band experimented, often flippantly, with other names before finally settling on "Fightmilk". The name is a reference to a fictional “alcoholic, dairy-based protein drink for bodyguards by bodyguards” that features in It's Always Sunny in Philadelphia.

After self-releasing their debut EP The Curse of Fightmilk in 2016 they caught the attention of longstanding London independent label Fierce Panda who released their second EP, Pity Party in 2017.

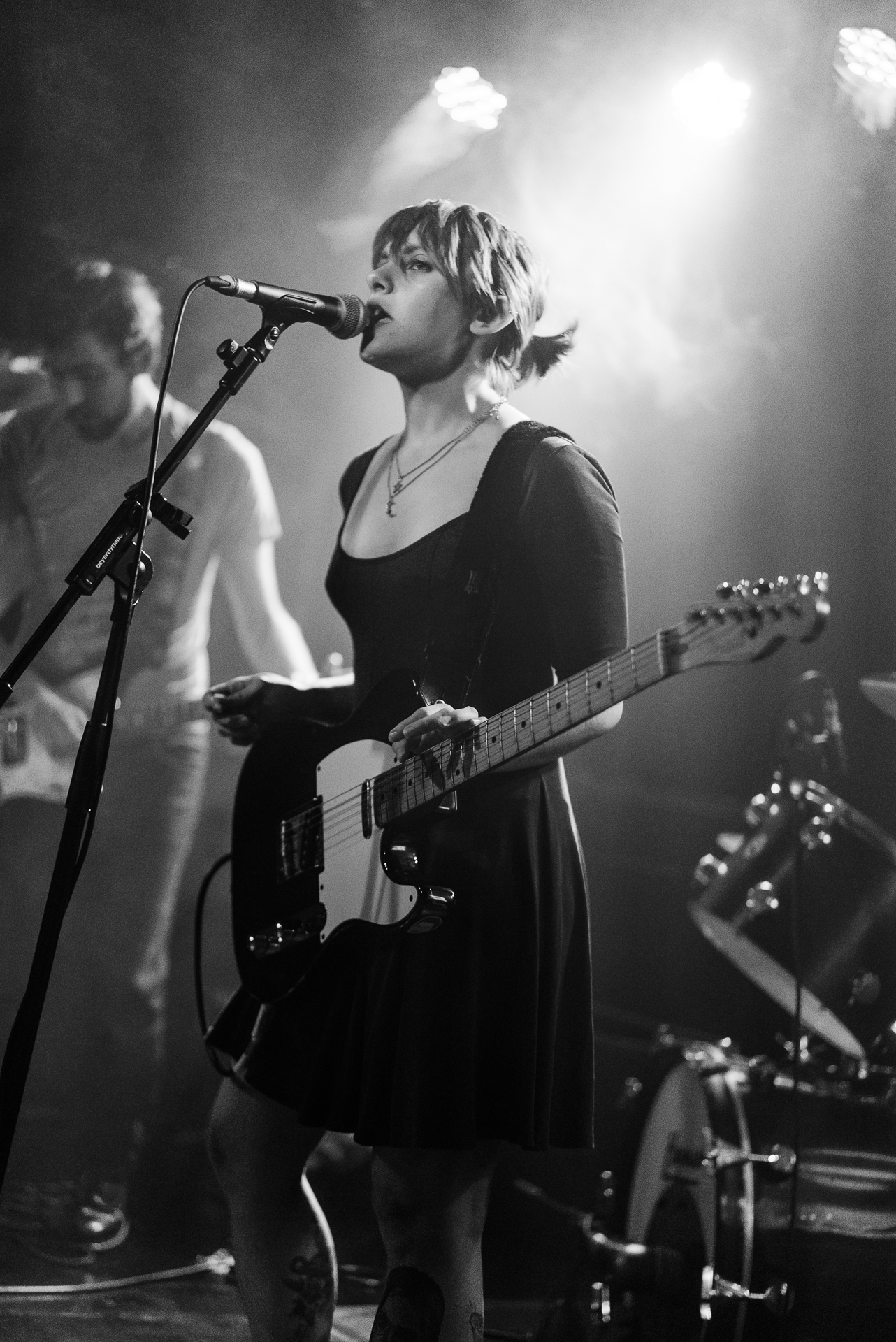
Fightmilk performing at The Lexington, Islington in 2017

Their first LP Not With That Attitude, recorded at Dean Street Studios, was released on 31 October 2018 by Derby-based record label Reckless Yes. They returned again to Dean Street for their second album, Contender, which was released 14 May 2021. Between albums original bassist Wainwright left, and was replaced by former Wolf Girl member Healey Becks.

On 20 August 2024, after releasing single Summer Bodies the month before, the band announced their third album No Souvenirs would be released on November 15 2024 through Fika Recordings and INH Records.

== Discography ==
=== Albums ===
- Not With That Attitude - Reckless Yes, LP, CD, MP3 (2018)
- Contender - Reckless Yes, LP, CD, MP3 (2021)
- No Souvenirs - Fika Recordings / INH Records, LP, CD, MP3 (2024)

=== Extended plays ===
- The Curse of Fightmilk - Self-released, MP3 (2016)
- Pity Party - Fierce Panda, MP3 (2017)
- The FME EP - Self-released, MP3, (2020)
- Fightmilk & Cookies - Self-released, MP3 (2020)

=== Compilations ===
- Both Types of Hayfever - Self-released, CD, MP3 (2018)
