= Finlay (band) =

British indie rock band

Finlay were a five-piece indie rock band from London. The band was formed in 1996 by school friends Adam Straw, Anamik Saha and Christopher Allison. Lorna Crabbe joined in August 1997 (two weeks before their first gig), and Giles Littleford three years later. They released a single and an EP on their own label, Growl Wow Records, before signing with British independent label Fortuna Pop! who released their two albums to critical acclaim. Kerrang! called their debut a "Ragged and Wonderful sliver of a debut", while Uncut magazine described Finlay's sound as "heroic and inspired pop music tuned in from an unearthly frequency". The band became particularly known for their DIY lo-fi aesthetic, most evident in their earlier recordings.

== Members ==
- Adam Straw (guitars, vocals)
- Anamik Saha (drums)
- Christopher Allison (guitars)
- Giles Littleford (bass)
- Lorna Crabbe (keyboards, vocals)

== Discography ==
=== Albums ===
- I Dreams & Visions – CD Fortuna Pop!, 2003)
- The Fall of Mary – CD Fortuna Pop!, 2006)

=== Singles ===
- "Little Dancing Solos" – 7-inch Single (Growl Wow Records, 2000)
- "Home" – 7-inch Single, CD Fortuna Pop!, 2003)

=== Compilation albums ===
- Maladjusted Malarkey – Double 7-inch EP, Finlay contributed the track "Favourite Chair" (Full Strength Records, 2001)
- Growl Wow EP No. 1 – 12-inch EP, Finlay contributed the track "Theme" (Growl Wow Records, 2002)
- I am Five, Truck 2003 – CD album, Finlay contributed the track "Plastic Cowboy" (Truck Records, 2003)
- Be True to Your School – A Fortuna POP! Compilation – LP/CD, Finlay contributed the track "Home" (Fortuna Pop!, 2008)

== Break-up ==
On 21 February 2007, it was announced by their label Fortuna Pop! that Finlay had split up. After the break-up, Anamik Saha and Giles Littleford joined east London band Dark Captain Light Captain, for whom Giles Littleford continues to play guitar.
