= Bugbears (album) =

2013 studio album by Darren Hayman featuring the Short Parliament

Studio album by Darren Hayman featuring The Short Parliament
- Released: 16 July 2013
- Genre: Folk rock; indie rock
- Length: 37:33
- Label: Fika Recordings

Darren Hayman chronology
The Violence (2012)	Bugbears (2013)	Chants for Socialists (2015)

Bugbears is the tenth studio album by English musician Darren Hayman featuring backing band the Short Parliament. It was released on 16 July 2013 by Fika Recordings. It is seen as a companion piece to Hayman's previous album The Violence (2012).

== Critical reception ==
Professional ratings
Aggregate scores
Source	Rating
Metacritic	74/100
Review scores
Source	Rating
MusicOMH	4/5 stars
NME	3.5/5 stars
Record Collector	4/5 stars
Uncut	8/10

At Metacritic, which assigns a normalised rating out of 100 to reviews from mainstream critics, the album has an average score of 74 based on 6 reviews, indicating "universal acclaim". Outlets who praised the album included The Quietus, NME, and MusicOMH. The album was also supported by Gideon Coe of BBC Radio 6 Music, with Hayman performing a session.

== Track listing ==
Bugbears track listing
No.	Title	Length
1.	"Marin Said"	2:12
2.	"Bugbears"	3:02
3.	"Sir Thomas Fairfax"	2:15
4.	"Seven Months Married"	2:50
5.	"Hey Then Up We Go"	2:21
6.	"The Owl"	2:18
7.	"The Contented"	3:40
8.	"Impossibilities"	4:56
9.	"Babylon Has Fallen"	2:46
10.	"I Live Not Where I Love"	3:57
11.	"Bold Astrologer"	3:23
12.	"Old England Grown New"	2:34
13.	"When The King Enjoys His Own Again"	1:28
Total length:		37:33
