= Mammoth Penguins =

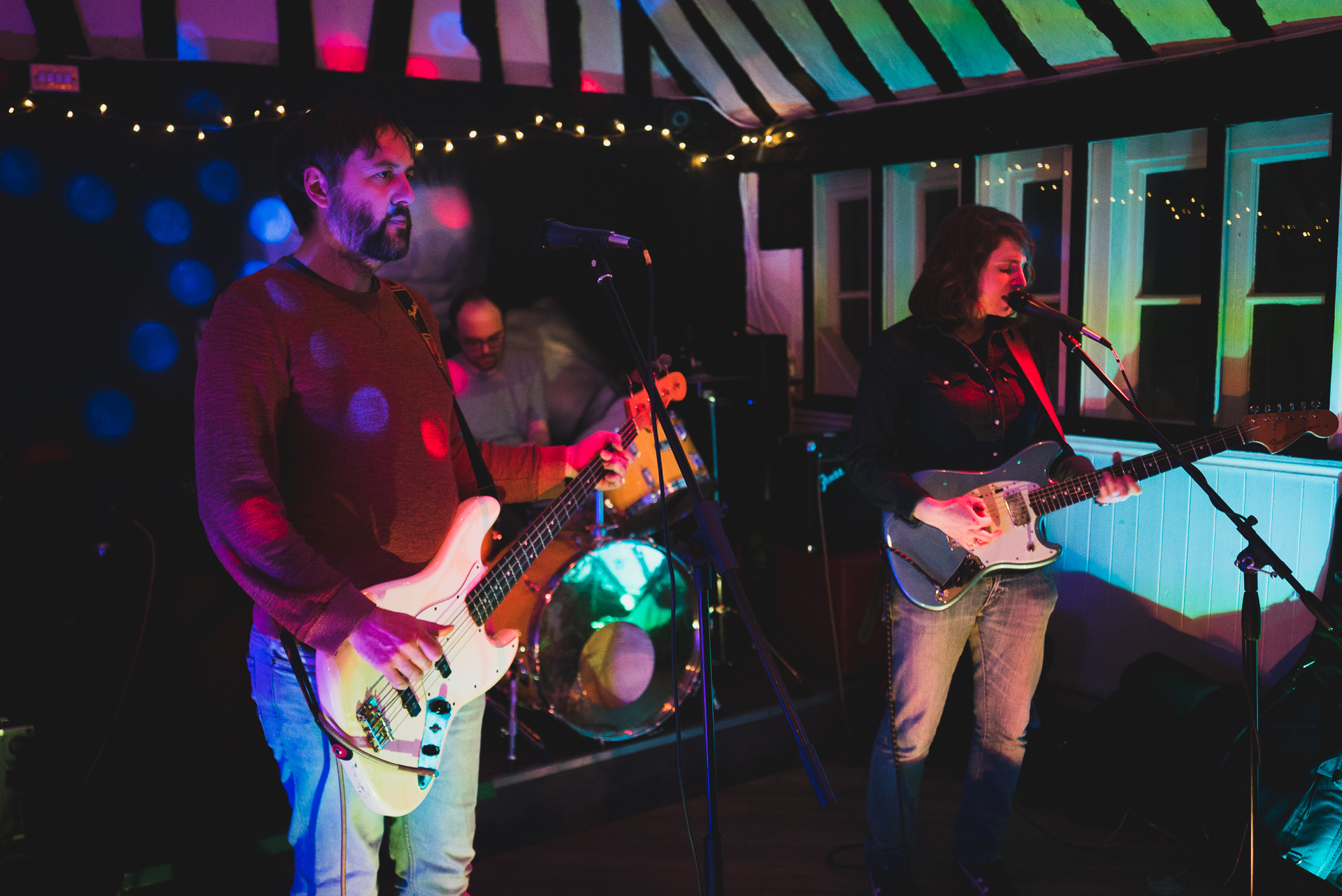
- Mammoth Penguins in 2018

Background information
- Origin: Cambridgeshire, England
- Genres: Indie pop, punk pop
- Labels: Fortuna Pop!; Kingfisher Bluez; WIAWIYA; Fika Recordings
- Members: Emma Kupa; Mark Boxall; Tom Barden

Mammoth Penguins are a British three-piece indie pop band based in Cambridgeshire, England. The band formed in 2013 and currently comprises members Emma Kupa, Mark Boxall and Tom Barden. They have released four albums on independent record labels.

== History ==
Emma Kupa's previous band Standard Fare broke up in 2013 following an eight-year run, and Kupa soon moved from Sheffield to Cambridgeshire. Switching from bass (which she played in Standard Fare) to guitar and vocals, Kupa teamed up with bassist Mark Boxall and drummer Tom Barden to form the combo Mammoth Penguins.

The new group's debut single, "When I Was Your Age", was released in June 2015, and their album, Hide and Seek, arrived a month later on the Fortuna Pop! label.

The band returned in 2017 with the "A Simple Misunderstanding" single for Kingfisher Bluez; they went on to make a record that expanded from their earlier punk-pop sound. Under the name Mammoth Penguins & Friends, they recorded a concept album about a man who faked his own death, then returned ten years later. Titled John Doe, it featured contributions from Haiku Salut's Sophie Barkerwood (programming/samples), as well as Russell Lomas (violin), and Joe Bear (samples/synths). The record was released in late 2017 on Where It's At Is Where You Are (often shortened to WIAWIYA).

They released their third album, There's No Fight We Can't Both Win, in 2019 on Fika Recordings. It again featured contributions from Joe Bear, as well as additional guitar by Faith Taylor. Veteran critic Robert Christgau regarded it as "the keeper" in Kupa's discography for how, "commonsensically and prosaically but also fervently and you bet tunefully, she's trying her best and getting better at" relationships, as reflected in the music's narratives.

== Discography ==
=== Albums ===
- Hide and Seek - Fortuna Pop!, LP, CD, MP3 (2015)
- John Doe - WIAWIYA, LP, CD, MP3 (2017)
- There's No Fight We Can't Both Win - Fika Recordings, LP, CD, MP3 (2019)
- Here - Fika Recordings, LP, CD, MP3 (2024)

== Singles ==
- "When I Was Your Age" - Fortuna Pop!, 7", MP3 (2015)
- "Propped Up" - Fortuna Pop!, 7", MP3 (2015)
- "A Simple Misunderstanding" - Kingfisher Bluez, 7", MP3 (2015)
