= Cures for Broken Hearts =

EP by ANT
- Released: 28 August 2000
- Recorded: Cushy productions Stockwell London
- Label: Fortune and Glory Records
- Producer: Antony Harding

Cures for Broken Hearts is a CD released by Antony Harding as ANT in 2000 on Fortune And Glory Records.

Released on 28 August 2000 by Fortune and Glory Records of Mosely, England, Cures For Broken Hearts's lo-fi recordings were mastered at Abbey Road Studios by Adam Nunn in June 2000. The mini-album was recorded by Suzanne Rhatigan and Antony Harding at Cushy Productions in Stockwell, London, between March 1997 and December 1997 on a reel to reel eight track (1/4" tape) and mixed to DAT.

== Track listing ==
1. You've Lost Your Appeal.
2. Tongues.
3. The Cure For Broken Hearts.
4. Fly on Your Wall.
5. Spoil.

== Musicians ==
- Johnny Greswell - violin, viola (2) (5)
- Antony Harding - vocals, electric guitar, acoustic guitar, drums, Wurlitzer piano
- John Morrison - bass guitar
- Suzanne Rhatigan - backing vocals, Wurlitzer piano. (3) (5)

== Press ==
- Acoustic cute pop songs with a bitter twisted edge - Melody Maker.
- Five extraordinarily fragile songs - The Fly.
- Finely crafted distillations of the affairs of the heart - The Jewish Chronicle.
- Sugar frosted heartbreak - Time Out.
- Likable delicate stuff - Q Magazine.
- The unexpected joy of Ant Harding’s solo mini album, Cures For Broken Hearts – Mojo.<ref<Mojo review 2000>/ref>
- Make a little space in your heart for this - Playlouder.
- Glittering with promise - SoundOnSound.
- A heart worn troubadour – NME.
