= The Loves =

Welsh pop-music band

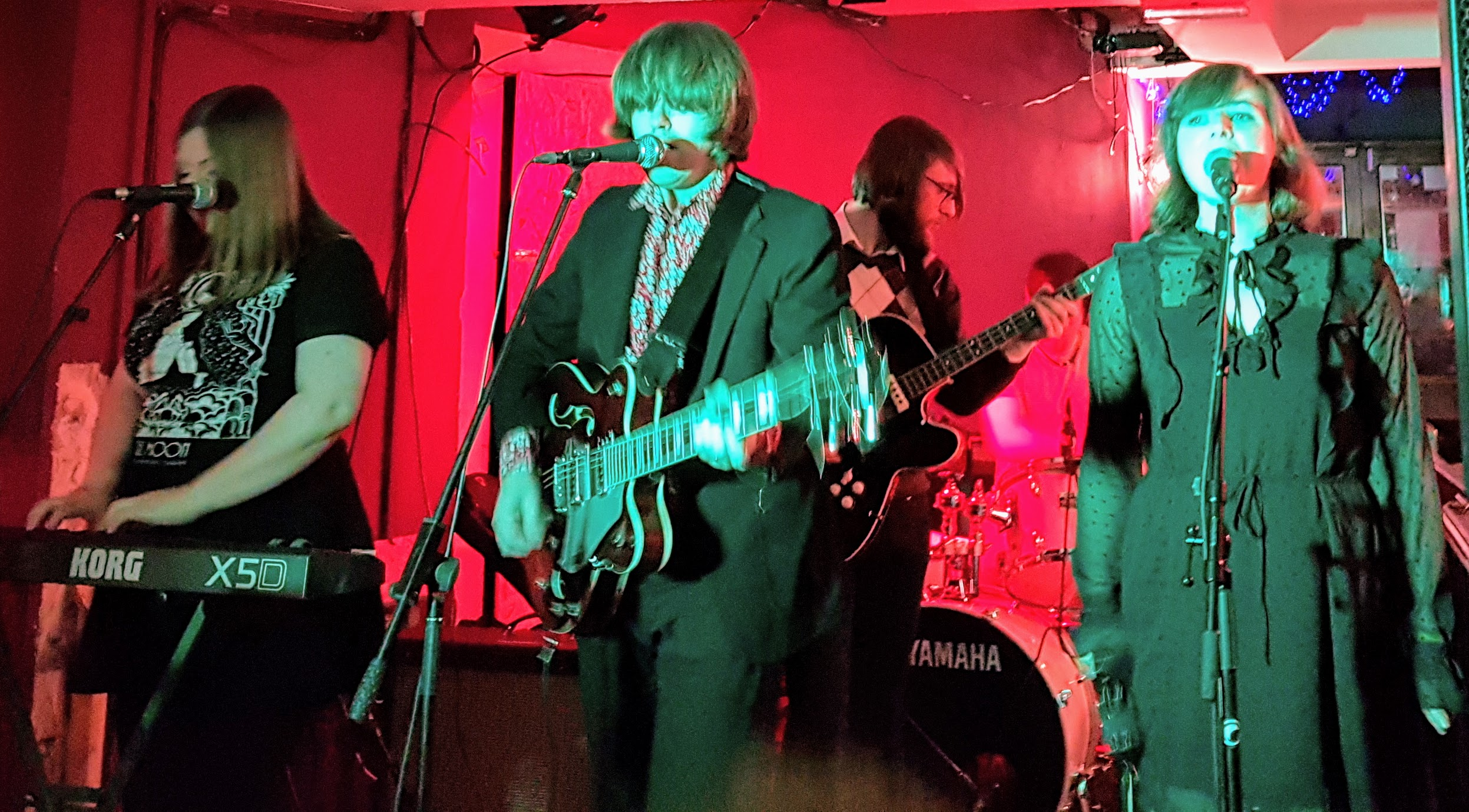
- The Loves, Dec 2017

Background information
- Origin: Cardiff, Wales
- Genres: Pop
- Years active: 2000–2011
- Labels: Fortuna Pop!, Track and Field Records
- Past members: Simon; Jenna; Jonny; Ed; Roger Gerard; Daniel; Alice; Danielle; Pnosni; Catrin; Dave; James; Daniel; Rhys; Anna; Phil; Liz; Rob; George; Andrew; Marc

The Loves were a heavily 1960s influenced pop band, formed in 2000 in Cardiff, Wales. Their debut album Love was released on Track and Field Records in 2004, but attracted generally hostile press coverage, and was commercially unsuccessful. Recorded mostly by Simon Love alone, their second album Technicolour was released in 2007 on Fortuna Pop. The band recorded four Peel sessions between 2001 and 2002: three in Maida Vale and one at Peel Acres (on Valentine's Day 2002).

Their third album, Three, (also released on Fortuna Pop) featured guest appearances from Rob Jones aka The Voluntary Butler Scheme, Delia Sparrow, Hefner's Darren Hayman and Harry Hill's TV Burp writer Daniel Maier. The Loves fourth and final album, ...Love You, was released on Fortuna Pop in 2010. It features The Velvet Underground's Doug Yule as the voice of Jesus. "Bubblegum" and "December Boy" were the double A sided single taken from the album in July 2010.

== Discography ==
=== Singles ===
All are 7" vinyl unless otherwise indicated.

- "Little Girl Blues" / "She'll Break Your Heart" CD (Boobytrap, 2001)
- "Boom-a-Bang-Bang-Bang" (Track and Field, 2001)
- "Just Like Bobby D" (Track and Field, 2002)
- "Shake Your Bones" (Track and Field, 2003)
- "Xs and Os" / "She'll Break Your Heart...Again" (Fortuna Pop!, 2006)
- "One-Two-Three" (Fortuna Pop!, 2007)
- "The Ex-Gurlfriend" (Fortuna Pop!, 2009)
- "December Boy" / "Bubblegum" (Fortuna Pop!, 2010)

=== Albums ===
- Love (Track and Field, 2004)
- Technicolour (Fortuna Pop!, 2007)
- Three (Fortuna Pop!, 2009)
- ...Love You (Fortuna Pop!, 2010)
- Clench (Due 2014, since cancelled)

=== Compilation albums ===
- A Very Fortuna Christmas Vol 2 (Fortuna Pop, 2002, contains a cover of John Lennon's "Cold Turkey")
- Pow! To The People (Track And Field, 2004, contains a cover of Daniel Johnston's "True Love Will Find You in the End")
- Que Viva le Pop (Fortuna Pop!, 2006, contains unreleased version of track "Honey" from Technicolour)
- This Town Ain't Big Enough for the 22 of Us (Twisted By Design, 2006 contains "Honey" from "Technicolour")
- Kats Karavan – The History of the John Peel Show (Universal, 2009 contains the original Boobytrap Singles Club version of "She'll Break Your Heart")
- Spread Love – The Loves Anthology 2000-2011 (Bandcamp, 2020 contains out-takes, alternate versions, b-sides, home demos and live recordings)
- ’'True Love – The Most of the Loves'’ (Daytrip Records, 2024)
