= Antony Harding =

English singer, songwriter and musician

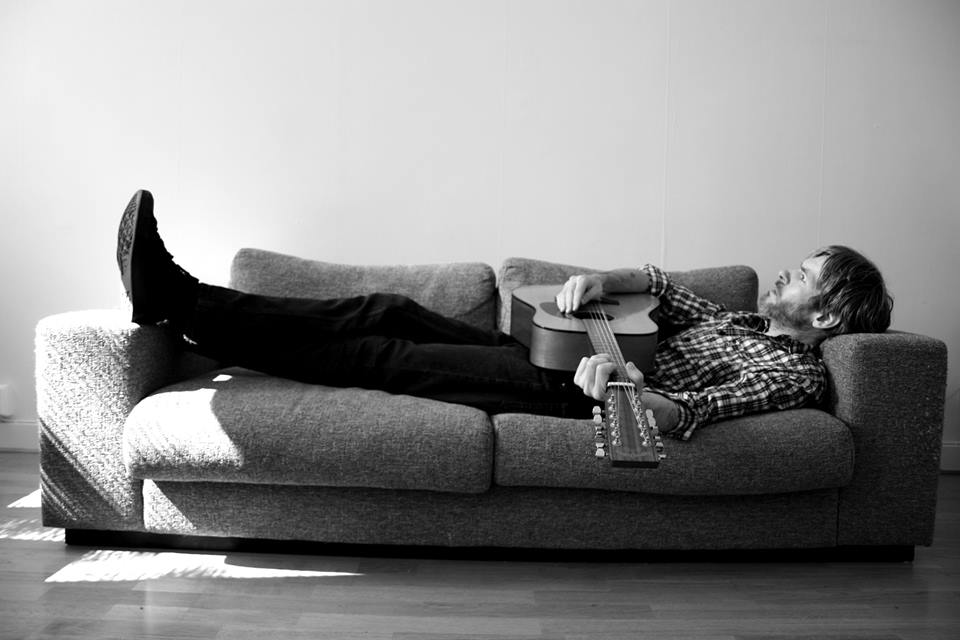

Background information
- Origin: Isle of Wight, England
- Genre: indie pop
- Years active: 1997–present
- Labels: Fortune and Glory UK, Homesleep IT, WWNBB IT
- Members: Antony Harding
- Website: curesforbrokenhearts

Antony Harding is an English singer-songwriter and musician from North London. He grew up on the Isle of Wight. He is best known as the drummer in London band Hefner, and has also played independently as ANT and now performs solo as Antony Harding. He has released several solo albums, including A Long Way To Blow A Kiss and Footprints Through the Snow, and has toured in England, Sweden, Germany, Switzerland, Italy, and China.

== Biography ==
Harding first appeared on stage in 1997 at the intimate 12 Bar Club in London supporting 'London's best unsigned band' Rhatigan on a monthly residency. In the year 2000, Antony's first CD, Cures For Broken Hearts, came out on Fortune & Glory Records (UK) to positive reviews: "Likeable delicate stuff" said Q Magazine, "An unexpected Joy", said Mojo. The CD received airplay on BBC Radio One, leading to a solo session for John Peel in the summer of that year, featuring four acoustic versions of songs that would later appear on his debut album. The debut album, a collection of London home recordings called A Long Way To Blow A Kiss, was quietly released in 2002 on Fortune and Glory Records. It was also warmly received: "Ant proves a delicate little joy", said Teletext, and "Scruffy, gorgeous notes-to-self" was how Mojo described it.

After relocating to Malmö, Sweden, Floating on the Breeze, a mini-album of home recordings was released on Italian label Homesleep Records (2003): "Charmed mini-album of ringing acoustic pop" said Uncut, "Pleasing bedroom rock" said the NME. Ant's first compilation CD of rarities and b-sides, Sad To See It's Morning, emerged on Fortune & Glory in 2004 to positive words: "Beautiful acoustic nuggets" (Mojo), "Sweet, charming, piquant pop gems" (Record Collector). The second album, Footprints Through the Snow, was recorded in 8 days one hot summer in Bologna, Italy in 2004 and released in 2006 to rave Italian reviews: "Close your eyes and breathe it in", recommended Subba-Cultcha.

After a break of some years, another mini-album of home recordings, this time aided by friends, entitled These Long Dark Country Roads, came out in 2009 on cult Spanish label Acuarela Discos: "Gorgeous lo-fi, acoustic pop songs" said Rock Feedback. The third album The Birds Sing Goodnight To You And Me, recorded with his old Hefner bandmates Darren Hayman, John Morrison and Jack Hayter, was released in March 2012 on Italian label We Were Never Being Boring, and was hailed as "the album of the year 2012" by Dandelion Radio's Mark Whitby. It was followed by a mini-mini-album of instrumentals entitled Only Pipe Dreams in the Pipeline, in 2013, once again on the WWNBB collective of Italy, described as "A feast of frothy folk" by Soundsxp.

Harding's fourth full-length album, By The Yellow Sea, and his first under his own name, set sail in June 2015. Another instrumental release, The Goldfinch and Other Instrumentals, came out on Christmas Day, 2017, on Black Candy Records and the long-awaited 'best of' ANT album featuring 15 tracks, Cry Your Little Heart Out, was released in December 2019 on the WWNBB Collective.

Antony has toured in England, Sweden, Germany, Switzerland, Italy and China, where he celebrated his 100th solo performance in 2011.

In 2018, Harding contributed a cover of Mother Sea to The Desperation Club, a tribute album to Cloud, which was released through Audio Antihero.

== Antony Harding discography ==
- A Soft Place (Split 7-inch single with Darren Hayman Black Kitten Records, Italy 2009)
- Only Pipe Dreams in the Pipeline (Digital mini-mini-album, We Were Never Being Boring, Italy/USA 2013)
- (This is Just) the Calm Before the Storm (Digital single, We Were Never Being Boring, Italy/USA 2014)
- Walk With No Real Place To Go (Digital single, We Were Never Being Boring, Italy/USA 2015)
- Once You Had A love (But The Love Refused To Grow) (Digital single, We Were Never Being Boring, Italy/USA 2015)
- By The Yellow Sea (CD album, We Were Never Being Boring, Italy/USA 2015)
- True Love (Under Sheets of Rain) (Digital single, We Were Never Being Boring, Italy/USA 2016)
- "The Goldfinch and Other Instrumentals" (Digital album, Black Candy Records, Italy 2017)

== ANT discography ==
- I Hope You'll Always Be There (7-inch single, Evil World Records, UK 1999)
- Where Happiness Begins (3 track CD, Fabulous Friends Records, Sweden 1999)
- Cures For Broken Hearts (CD mini-album, Fortune & Glory Records, UK 2000)
- A Long Way To Blow A Kiss (CD album, Fortune & Glory Records, UK 2002)
- Floating on the Breeze (CD mini-album, Homesleep Records, Italy 2003)
- Mountains (Imprints of Emotion EP) (Split 7-inch EP, Zenith/Smudgey Records, Sweden 2003)
- Sad to See It's Morning (CD compilation album of singles and rarities, Fortune & Glory Records, UK 2004)
- Footprints Through the Snow (CD album, Homesleep Records, Italy 2006)
- Footprints Through the Snow (CD album, Avant Garden Records, Taiwan 2006)
- When Your Heart Breaks (Into Many Little Pieces) (Split 7-inch single, Let's Expect Art Records, Sweden 2006)
- I Couldn't Remember the Dream (Split 7-inch single, Black Candy Records, Italy 2006)
- These Long Dark Country Roads (CD mini album, Acuarela Discos, Spain 2009)
- When The Morning arrives (Digital album of out-takes and rarities, Antsongs, Sweden 2009)
- Footprints Through the Snow (CD album, Pocket Records/Sounds Good, China 2011)
- Kisses on a Plate (Digital single, We Were Never Being Boring, Italy/USA 2011)
- The Birds Sing Goodnight To You And Me (CD album, We Were Never Being Boring, Italy/USA 2012)
- Cry Your Little Heart Out (Digital best of album, We Were Never Being Boring, Italy/USA 2019)
- Kisses on a Plate (CD EP, We Were Never Being Boring, Italy/USA 2021)

== Radio sessions ==
- 12/08/2000 - P3 Live Sveriges Radio P3. Live in concert at the Emmaboda Festival, Emmaboda, Sweden: You've Lost Your Appeal/The Queue To Your Heart/Where Happiness Begins/Not Sleeping The Same Way/The Cure For Broken Hearts/I Hope You'll Always Be There/Fly On Your Wall
- 12/10/2000 - John Peel Session, BBC Radio 1. Producer: Simon Askew. Engineer: Ralph Jordan. Recorded at Maida Vale 4 on 26 July 2000:History/Any Girl Can Make Me Smile/Maybe Love Will Return/The Trick
- 05/2003 Giovanni Gandolfi, Radio Citta Del Capo, live session, Bologna, Italy: You’ve Lost Your Appeal/Cry Your Little Eyes Out/The Queue To Your Heart/The Silence Has Broken/I Always Hurt The One That I Love/Not Sleeping The Same Way/The Cure For Broken Hearts/Any Girl Can Make Me Smile
- 05/2004 Giovanni Gandolfi, Radio Citta Del Capo, live session, Bologna, Italy: A Long Way To Blow A Kiss/Blame It on the Language/When Your Heart Breaks (Into Many Little Pieces)
- 2004 - Krister Bladh, Tandem Pop Radio, live song & interview, Lund, Sweden: Haven't You Got Anywhere Left You Can Run To?
- 04/2006 - Giovanni Gandolfi, Radio Citta Del Capo, live session, Bologna, Italy: Change with the season/Those memories/Haven’t you got anywhere left you can run to/I couldn’t remember the dream/Your heart got bored
- 08/03/2006 - The Glass Shrimp Show, Resonance FM live session, London: When Your Heart Breaks (Into Many Little Pieces/In Your Dreams/Haven’t You Got Anywhere Left You Can Run To/Up Sticks And Go
- 09/03/2006 - Tom Robinson, BBC6 session, London: Haven’t you got anywhere left you can run to/Those memories/Change with the season/We didn’t move a muscle
- 03/2007 - Jean Luc, Radio Onda D'urto, live session, Brescia, Italy: Slipped Away/Up Sticks And Go
- 03/2012 - Mark Whitby, Dandelion Radio session:Hand-Me-Downs/Light This Love And Watch It Burn/Where’s My Love (Caroline cover)/Fireworks in This Small Town Tonight
- 05/05/2012 - Minimal Radio, Mini Cat Radio session, Beijing, China: Black Swans on the Water/When The Robin Spreads His Wings And Sings/Oh What A Day (Oh What A Night)
