= Chants for Socialists =

Studio album by Darren Hayman
- Released: 2 February 2015
- Recorded: William Morris Gallery; Kelmscott House; Kelmscott Manor
- Genre: Folk rock
- Length: 40:38
- Label: WIAIWYA Records
- Producer: Darren Hayman

Darren Hayman chronology
Bugbears (2013)	Chants for Socialists (2015)

Chants for Socialists is the eleventh solo studio album by English singer/songwriter Darren Hayman. It was released by WIAIWYA (Where It's At is Where You Are) Records on 2 February 2015.

== Background ==
Chants for Socialists is an album based on the 19th century protest poetry of "Victorian polymath" William Morris. Hayman found a copy of Morris' Chants For Socialists pamphlet in the William Morris Gallery and decided to set it to music, stating to The Quietus: "I loved how immediate and divisive it seemed. And I liked the idea of seeing it in a record shop. It seemed to set an agenda. And it reminded me of that time when I started buying records."

The album was recorded in situ at three of Morris' houses, the William Morris Gallery, Kelmscott House and Kelmscott Manor; Hayman playing Morris' piano on "The March of the Workers". Most of the songs on the album feature a choir recruited from Hayman's local fanbase, whether they were musical or not, in order to give the vocals "a lack of polish".

In keeping with the Morris-influenced Arts and Crafts movement, Hayman used the Kelmscott Press at Kelmscott House to hand-print 500 record sleeves. This is the same press that Morris used to print his own books as well as the Kelmscott Chaucer, which is now housed in the British Library.

Chants for Socialists was made available as a free download, or pay what you want, in keeping with the socialist ethos of the project. It was also released on CD and red vinyl, including a limited run of 100 double vinyl copies (one red, one green) that came with an additional dub version of the album, called Dubs for Socialists.

== Critical reception ==
Professional ratings
Aggregate scores
Source	Rating
Metacritic	80/100
Review scores
Source	Rating
AllMusic	4/5 stars
Crackle Feedback	8.5/10
Drowned in Sound	8/10
Mojo	4/5 stars
musicOMH	4/5 stars
NME	7/10
Record Collector	4/5 stars
The Skinny	4/5 stars
Uncut	8/10

On the Metacritic website, which aggregates reviews from critics and assigns a normalised rating out of 100, Chants for Socialists received a score of 80, based on 1 mixed and 6 positive reviews. Mojo writes that the album has a tone of "forbearance rather than rabble-rousing provocation". The review in NME states that Hayman "breathes life into Morris' poems", calling "May Day 1894" "fuzzy power pop and crediting "March of the Workers" with "gorgeous, electric piano". Uncut state that the combination of Morris' words and Hayman's "subtle but contemporary melodies" combine to deliver "fascinating results" and "songs of coiled, sincere power". The reviewer in Record Collector writes that "a communitarian spirit of which Morris would have approved pervades." and comments that "Hayman avoids the preciousness that often blights heritage-inspired undertakings". Drowned in Sound call Chants for Socialists a "beautifully crafted love-letter to the real humanity that is the soul and centre of socialism, both sad and sweet, melancholy and inspiring - a collection of songs that belong to everyone and cement Hayman’s place as a nationalised treasure". The review in musicOMH states that "Chants For Socialists is full of beautifully written and well-crafted tunes" describing songs that "offer comfort, hope, and occasionally a little sadness". AllMusic write that "Hayman's brand of pop has always been on the intellectual side and the archival nature of these Morris texts dovetails well with the kind of music he's been making in the years leading up to this fine release." The Skinny state that "in an age where political protest is reduced to smug hectoring and convenient self-advancement, Hayman's take on Morris's late 19th century works is modest but true", calling the song arrangements as "impeccable as the intent".

== Track listing ==
All tracks written by Darren Hayman and William Morris unless specified. Credits on Dubs for Socialists as main album

1. "Awake London Lads" – 1:33
2. "May Day 1894" – 4:04
3. "March of the Workers" – 5:37
4. "The Day is Coming" – 4:05
5. "Down Among the Dead Men" (Robert Rotifer, Hayman, Morris) – 4:34
6. "A Death Song" – 4:52
7. "All for the Cause" – 3:17
8. "The Voice of Toil" – 4:15
9. "The Message of The March Wind" (Ralegh Long, Hayman, Morris) – 4:38
10. "No Master High or Low" – 3:44

Dubs for Socialists (included with the deluxe edition vinyl)

1. "Awake London Dub" – 1:50
2. "May Dub 1894" – 4:03
3. "Dub of the Workers" – 3:35
4. "The Dub is Coming" – 4:30
5. "Down Among the Dub Men" – 3:38
6. "A Death Dub" – 3:46
7. "All for the Dub" – 2:30
8. "The Dub of Toil" – 4:21
9. "The Message of the Dub Wind" – 4:01
10. "No Master High or Dub" – 3:27

== Personnel ==
- Darren Hayman
- Ian Button
- Donal Sweeney
- Nathan Thomas
- Dan Mayfield
- Ralegh Long
- Robert Rotifer
