= Darren Hayman =

English singer-songwriter and guitarist

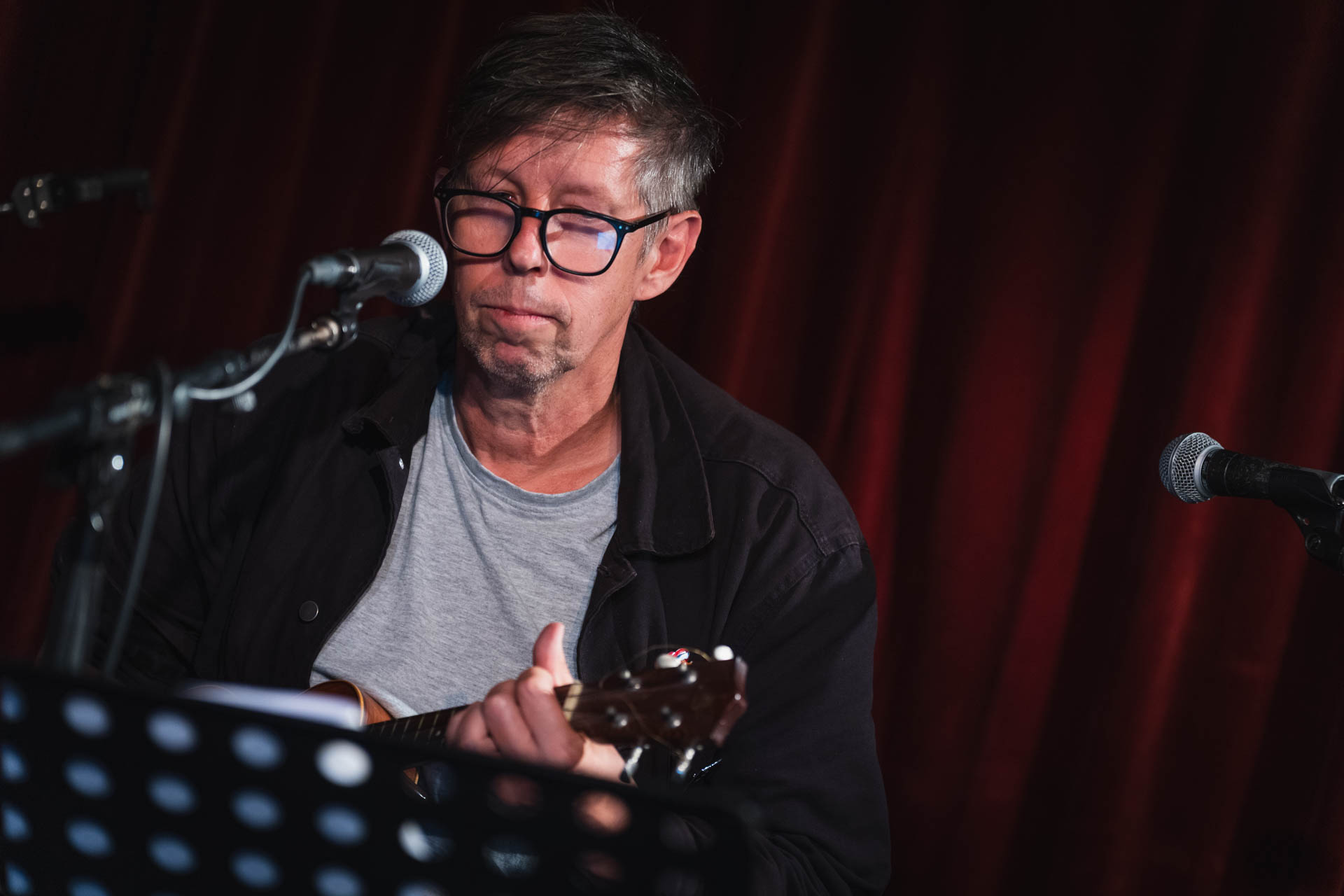
- Darren Hayman at the Green Note in July 2025

Background information
- Born: Darren Russell Hayman; 1 December 1970 (age 55)
- Origin: Brentwood, Essex, England
- Genres: Indie rock, Electronic, Folk rock
- Occupations: Singer-songwriter, musician
- Instruments: Guitar, Ukulele, Piano, Drums, Bass
- Years active: 1995–present
- Labels: The Track & Field Organisation; Fortuna Pop! Static Caravan Recordings; Belka; Where It's At Is Where You Are Records; Fika Recordings; Gare du Nord; P572; Rivertones; Audio Antihero
- Website: www.hefnet.com

Darren Hayman (born 1 December 1970) is an English singer-songwriter and guitarist, who debuted as the writer, lead singer, and guitarist in Hefner. Since Hefner disbanded in 2002, Hayman has had a prolific solo career releasing numerous albums under his own name while releasing music with The French, New Starts, and others. He has worked with The Wave Pictures, producing an album for them, directing three of their music videos and employing them as his backing band. In January, 2011, Hayman recorded and released a song every day in the month of January, working with several collaborators. Hayman also paints and has exhibited his work at exhibitions about animals in space, racing dogs and other topics.

== Career ==
=== Hefner (1992-2002) ===
Initially seeking to be a comic book artist Darren Hayman studied at Maidstone College of Art. His focus moved towardsmusic, and he debuted as a solo artist under the Hefner name in the 1990s, before expanding to a band lineup with Antony Harding, John Morrison and Jack Hayter. Working primarily with the labels Too Pure and Beggars Banquet Records the band had a number of charting releases. Hefner became favourites of BBC DJ John Peel and recorded several BBC sessions, performed on BBC Choice, and made multiple appearances in the BBC Radio 1 Festive Fifty. The band split in 2002, their discography numbering four studio albums as well as two compilations and a two live albums.

=== The French and The Stereo Morphonium (2003-2005) ===
Hayman's first works after Hefner were with The French, an electronic duo with John Morrison. They released their Local Information album on Too Pure in 2003, which received a five star review in The Guardian. The pair recorded two Maida Vale sessions, and had two entries in the 2003 Festive Fifty. After the French, Hayman had legal issues with Too Pure. In 2005, Hayman issued an EP with The Stereo Morphonium, another electronic project. Hayman stated afterwards that he "spunked his career up the wall spectacularly" by following Hefner with The French, adding in 2026 that "when I make an electronic record, I have to expect a smaller reaction."

=== Solo debut, Table for One and The Secondary Modern (2005-2007) ===
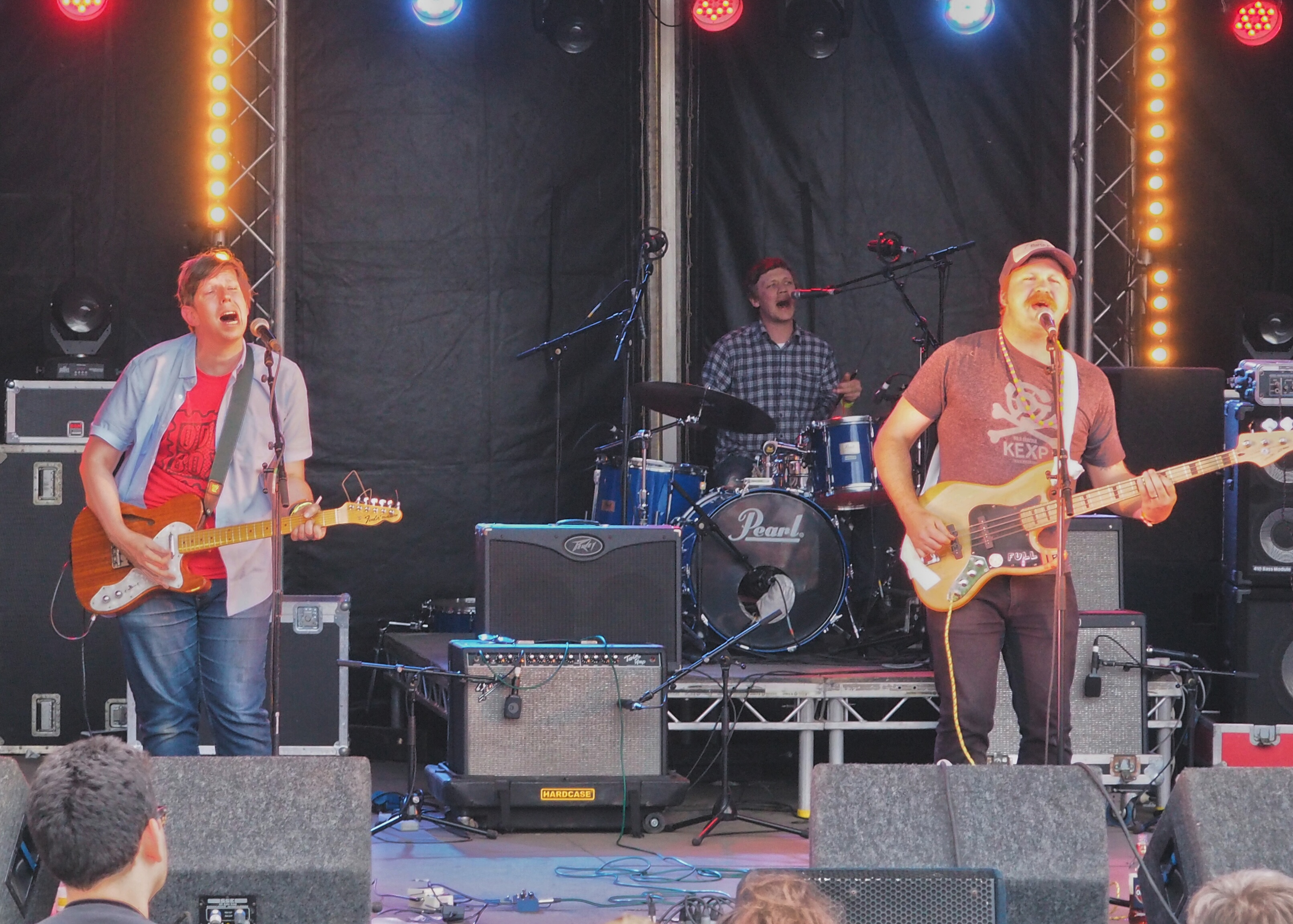
Darren Hayman and the Secondary Modern at Indietracks 2016

In 2005, Hayman released his first material under his known name, beginning a four-part-series of British Holiday-themed EPs for Static Caravan Recordings, and Cortinaland for Acuarela Discos, who had previously released The Hefner Heart EP. He performed his first BBC session as a solo artist for Huw Stephens in May 2005. The following year, Hayman recorded a second session for Stephens, as well as a BBC Radio 6 Music session for Tom Robinson.

Hayman's debut solo album Table for One was released in 2006 by Track & Field, which was rated five stars in a review from The Guardian. It was followed in 2007 by Darren Hayman & the Secondary Modern, his second solo album, featuring a new backing band. The album featured guest appearances from John Howard and Pete Astor.

Hayman then employed The Wave Pictures as his backing band, and a short tour in 2007 resulted in the live album Madrid, credited to Darren Hayman & The Wave Pictures, as well as a TV performance on Basico.

=== Hayman, Watkins, Trout and Lee, Great British Holiday EPs and tour with Jack Hayter (2008) ===
In 2008, Hayman fronted self-proclaimed "East London bluegrass" outfit Hayman, Watkins, Trout and Lee, releasing an eponymous album recorded around Hayman's kitchen table over two days. The band is named after Dave Watkins from Hayman's band The Secondary Modern, John Lee and Simon Trought (spelled Trout here). However, Lee and Trought do not appear on the album, which instead features David Tattersal from The Wave Pictures and fiddle player Dan Mayfield. The album was reissued in 2026 with two additional songs, covers of Jonathan Richman and Iris DeMent.

Also in 2008, Hayman released the compilation Great British Holiday EPs, which collects the EPs Caravan Songs (2005), Ukulele Songs from the North Devon Coast (2006), Eastbourne Lights (2006) and Minehead (2007), which were recorded in the EPs' titular locations by Hayman during holidays. Hayman states that the collection is about "a love of days gone by." This was followed by the release of a further EP called Songs For Harmonium And Drum Machine for the p572 label in Canada, with all the songs titled after and written about the Brat Pack members Andrew McCarthy, Judd Nelson, Emilio Estevez and Ally Sheedy.

During the summer, Hayman toured the UK and Spain with Jack Hayter, performing Hefner songs, including sets at End of the Road Festival and Estrella Damm Primavera Club.

=== The Essex Trilogy parts one and two (2009-2010) ===
In 2009, Hayman released the first part of his "Essex Trilogy," Pram Town, named after Harlow, in Essex, which was given the Pram Town name by the Daily Mirror in the 1950s. The album is a 'folk-opera' concerning a relationship between a man and a woman who is out of his league, Hayman stating that the album "is a set of songs about someone who doesn't escape. It’s about how pride can lose you love. It's about high and low ambition and the gap between." In promotion of the album, Hayman recorded a BBC session for Tom Robinson.

Essex Arms, the second installment in the "Essex Trilogy", was released 2010, his first release on the Fortuna Pop! record label. It is an album concerning Essex on a larger scale than Pram Town, with songs about factories closing, dogging hot spots and the littered countryside, featuring guest appearances from Emmy the Great and Fanfarlo. It received favourable reviews from The Quietus, Uncut, MusicOMH, Drowned in Sound, The Line of Best Fit, the BBC, and others.

=== January Songs recording and Vostok 5 exhibition (2011) ===
During January 2011, Hayman recorded and released a song every day of the month, as well as keeping a video diary each day, making them available free of charge. The songs featured different collaborators on different days, including Elizabeth Morris from Allo Darlin', The Wave Pictures, Jack Hayter and Ballboy. Hayman states about the project: "I get tired of having to wait to release songs and records. I thought this would be a way to solve the release bottleneck. I thought it would be funny and at least a little interesting." The song "I Know I Fucked Up" placed at #4 in the Festive Fifty, now under the umbrella of Dandelion Radio.

Following the January project, Hayman curated the Vostok 5 exhibition at the Outside world Gallery in London which ran from 1 to 7 September 2011. The exhibition was "for people who love rockets and animals" according to Hayman and featured songs and paintings by Hayman, Paul Rains (Allo Darlin'), Duncan Barrett (Tigercats), Robert Rotifer (Rotifer) and Sarah Lippet (Fever Dream) about animals and humans that have travelled to space, including soviet space dogs, Alexei Leonov, Wernher von Braun and Sergei Korolev. Hayman then released The Green and the Grey (2011), an album featuring additional tracks from the Essex Arms sessions and produced the album Beer in the Breakers (2011) for The Wave Pictures.

=== The Ship's Piano, Rotifer and Christmas in Haworth (2011) ===
In October 2011, Hayman released The Ship's Piano, an album recorded entirely on a 1933 fold-away piano, the type of piano often found "crammed into the corners of seafaring parlours." Hayman told Clash that the piano is the first instrument he owned that was older than he was and that the title song is about an imagined history of the piano's former owners. The record was written while Hayman was recovering from a head injury, "which rendered him extra sensitive to sound". The album's single, "I Taught You How to Dance" reached #68 in the UK Physical Singles Chart.

In December 2011 The Hosting Couple by Rotifer was released, with whom Hayman was the bass player at the time, alongside frontman Robert Rotifer and Ian Button. The album was produced by Wreckless Eric and released on Edwyn Collins' AED Records. Rotifer states of Hayman that "it was always quite funny playing with Darren Hayman, because he is not really a bass player. He has this tiny toy bass, a little Fender, and he had this really idiosyncratic way of playing". For his final projects in 2011, Hayman curated a musical advent calendar in association with Fika Recordings, where two festive songs were made available for free every day of the advent period, and released the Christmas EP, Christmas in Haworth.

=== January Songs collection, The Shit Piano, and Lido (2012) ===
In January 2012, one year after recording a song a day, Hayman released an album of all the tracks called January Songs, each individual CD coming with its own hand-drawn cover art. This was followed a few months later by The Shit Piano, a re-recording of The Ship's Piano using vintage Casio keyboards. The album was recorded in one day, and is influenced by "the tradition of remixes and ... dub versions of albums", Hayman stating that the title is based on a pun and that the album "definitely isn't 'shit' on purpose." In April 2012 Hayman directed the music video for The Wave Pictures single "Spaghetti".

In August 2012, Hayman released Lido, an instrumental album with songs named after, inspired by and often featuring field recordings of lidos. Included are songs about lidos that are still open, such as London Fields and the Brockwell Lido, but also ones that have closed, such as the Brentwood lido.

=== The Essex Trilogy completed with The Violence (2012) ===
In October 2012, Hayman completed his "Essex Trilogy" with the release of The Violence, a double album about 17th-century British civil wars and the Essex Witch Trials conducted by Matthew Hopkins. The album includes "Henrietta Maria," which is sung from the perspective of Charles I as he serenades Henrietta Maria of France. Hayman stated that he found parallels with those eras and modern times, stating: "I make some sort of connection between how in times of hardship or war we tend to distrust the outsider, how there is a fear and mistrust in a community."

=== The Four Queens EP, Bugbears, "Old Man," Blue House EP (2013) ===
Continuing further with the historical theme Hayman released the Four Queens EP with The Long Parliament in April 2013. This contained, alongside "Henrietta Maria" from The Violence, and songs about three other queens; Elizabeth I (a second collaboration with Elizabeth Morris), Lady Jane Grey and Eleanor Of Aquitaine. Darren Hayman & The Long Parliament issued an indie rock single, "Old Man," the following month.

It was followed by the Bugbears album in July 2013. The album is considered a companion piece to The Violence and contains updated versions of 17th-century folk songs with new lyrics, including "Sir Thomas Fairfax March", about Thomas Fairfax. Starting that same month, Hayman played the first of a one-year run of shows, entitled 'Darren Hayman's Occupation', at the Vortex Jazz Club in London. The shows were all themed and featured support slots from a variety of performers, such as Chris T-T, The Pictish Trail, Robin Ince and Stewart Lee. Hayman directed two more videos for The Wave Pictures in October 2013; "Lisbon," and "Red Cloud Road." In November 2013, for the Independent Label Market, Hayman released the Blue House EP.

=== Papernut Cambridge and The Great Electric (2013-present) ===
Hayman began working with two new groups. Firstly, Ian Button's Papernut Cambridge with Mat Flint, Ralegh Long and Jack Hayter, who released their debut album Cambridge Nutflake in December 2013. Their second album, There's No Underground followed in October 2014.

Hayman began playing the synthesizer for The Great Electric, alongside band members Malcolm Doherty, Rob Hyde, Duncan Hemphill and Pete Gofton. EP 1, the debut recording by The Great Electric, was released in October 2014.

In 2016, Hayman released a single with Papernut Cambridge as his backing band, on which they covered "I've Been a Bad, Bad Boy" by Paul Jones and "Big, Big Deal" by Steve Harley & Cockney Rebel, which reached #38 in the UK Physical Singles Chart and #29 in the Vinyl Singles Chart.

=== Zoology exhibition, CD-r releases and first Emma Kupa collaboration (2014) ===
In January 2014, Hayman performed a session for Marc Riley on BBC Radio 6 Music. He then contributed seven paintings of greyhounds that had raced at the Walthamstow Dog Track to the Zoology exhibition at the E17 Art House in May. He also issued two CD-R releases, the Wembley Eiffel Tower ambient music project for the Glass Reservoir label, and the Dog EP, which was limited to 20 copies, which all included individual hand-painted covers, and was sold at the Independent Label Market.

Hayman asked Emma Kupa to sing on his February single, Boy, Look At What You Can’t Have Now, which reached #20 in the UK Physical Singles Chart.

=== Chants for Socialists, Folk Lullabies for Children and the Childless, and Florence (2015) ===
In February 2015 Hayman released his next album Chants for Socialists, setting the poetry of William Morris to music. Throughout early 2015 Hayman released three EPs as Brute Love, an improvisational synthesizer band Hayman formed with Emma Winston. In the summer of 2015 Hayman released Folk Lullabies for Children and the Childless, a limited edition cassette with versions of lullabies from around the world. In November, Hayman's issued his third album of the year, Florence, which was recorded whilst Hayman was on holiday and his first album without any collaborators.

=== Thankful Villages and The Hayman Kupa Band (2015-2018) ===
Following the 2014 duet single with Kupa, the pair formed The Hayman Kupa Band. Their debut single was "Someone to Care For," released in 2015, and reached #53 in the UK Physical Singles Chart and #35 in the Vinyl Singles Chart. They recorded BBC Radio 6 Music sessions for Marc Riley in 2016 and 2017. Their self-titled album was issued on 21 July 2017, and the "No More Bombs" single placed at #44 in that year's Festive Fifty.

On 3 June 2016, Hayman released the first of three albums of work inspired by and written in-situ at Thankful Villages - settlements in England and Wales from which all their then-members of the armed forces survived World War I. He would also perform at some of the villages, with his performance in Maplebeck included in The Guardian's "our writers' favourite gigs of 2016." For this project, he received the 2016 AIM Independent Music Award for Hardest Working Band/Artist.

During the Thankful Villages series, Hayman released Trains, and Get Out of the Way, a music and sound recording he had created for a Finn Thomson art exhibit the previous year. He also performed BBC sessions for Tom Robinson in 2016 and Marc Riley in 2017.

=== Various Labels, 12 Astronauts, COVID-19 lockdown releases, Home Time, and You Will Not Die (2019-2022) ===
After completing the three part, Thankful Villages series, Hayman released the 12 Astronauts concept album through Where It's At Is Where You Are, which included a re-recording of Hefner's "Alan Bean" single in 2019. That same year, he released an instrumental album on Gare du Nord, entitled Songs of High Altitude, and as a part of the folk collective The Unattached, Hayman contributed to their debiut album, Songs for the Prophets.

In 2020, Hayman released a 33rpm 7' single via Formosa Punk, entitled I Can Travel Through Time containing ten short songs. This accompanied the acoustic Home Time album, which was released through Fika Recordings.

During the COVID-19 lockdown in the United Kingdom, Hayman self-released three EPs directly to Bandcamp. This is included the Rock, Songs from the Doll's House Room in June 2020; the electronic Actually I Still Really, Really Miss You in December, which previewed his You Will Not Die album; and Music to Watch News By in February 2021, which was described by Alexis Petridis of The Guardian "as intended to be listened to when you hit mute on the TV bulletins, unable to take any more: slightly ramshackle acoustic instrumentals, soothing and warm."

In November 2022, Hayman released the electronic double album, You Will Not Die, via Fika Recordings.

=== Night Paintings exhibition, Withered Hand tour, and The French reunion (2023) ===
In 2023, Hayman presented his Night Paintings exhibition, inspired by night walks in London. It was accompanied by the book, The Last Dog Walk, which contained paintings and short poems. Later in the year, Hayman also toured with Withered Hand.

Hayman briefly reunited with John Morrison for a new recording by The French, "Snaa," which appeared on the snö compilation from Where It's At Is Where You Are on 1 December 2023.

=== New Starts and London underground station painting project (2024-present) ===
In 2024, Heyman formed a four-piece band called New Starts. He explained the choice: “I wanted a band again, and not a band that just backed me up and played my old songs. When we form our first bands in our teens we just find some friends and work through the musical differences. I usually look for players who play in a way I’m used to. This time I looked for variance and was led by people’s personality.”

The band released their debut album, More Break-Up Songs, via Fika Recordings in August 2024.

That same year, Hayman also began an art project to paint all 273 London Underground stations.

=== Amazing Things (2025) ===
Under the name Darren Hayman & His Electric Guitars, he released Amazing Things in 2025, an album about his friend's death. As a cassette-only b-side for the album's "Nobody You'd Know" single, Hayman covered "Borderline" by Madonna.

=== The "Never-Ending Singles Club," David Gedge Duo tours, and back catalogue project (2024-present) ===
On 31 December 2023, Hayman announced a "Never-ending singles club," where he releases two new songs per month via Patreon, in addition to commentaries and behind-the-scenes material.

Hayman accompanied David Gedge Duo on tour as part of promotion of the Tales from The Wedding Present books. Hayman opened the events and also interviewed Gedge.

In 2026, via his Belka imprint and the Audio Antihero label, Hayman began resupplying or first issuing material that was missing from digital music services, including expanded editions of Hayman, Watkins, Trout and Lee, and The Violence. In a May 2026 interviews with The J-Card Podcast and God Is In the TV, he also noted that unreleased material from The French was coming.

=== The French's TV Themes EP and I'm Your Team (2026) ===
On September 18 2026, Hayman issued the TV Themes EP by The French via Audio Antihero. The EP is a collection of covers of television theme songs (The Littlest Hobo, Miami Vice, Big John, Little John and Hill Street Blues), a re-recording of their 2004 session for John Peel.

On October 16, Hayman released a new full-length album, I'm Your Team. Like TV Themes the month before, this was a surprise, previously unannounced release via Audio Antihero. The album was originally recorded after 2022's You Will Not Die, and featured a minimal, downbeat electronic sound. The album was created using only Hayman's voice, a Yamaha DX7, a Roland TR-707, and a Rickenbacker bass guitar.

== Discography ==
See also the discographies for Hefner and The French

=== Studio albums ===
- Table for One (2006, Track & Field)
- Darren Hayman & the Secondary Modern (2007, Track & Field) – with The Secondary Modern
- Pram Town (2009, Track & Field) – with The Secondary Modern
- Essex Arms (2010, Fortuna Pop!) – with The Secondary Modern
- The Ship's Piano (2011, Fortuna Pop!)
- The Shit Piano (2012, Belka)
- Lido (2012, Where It's at Is Where You Are)
- January Songs (2012, Belka)
- The Violence (2012, Fortuna Pop! / 2026, Audio Antihero) – with The Long Parliament
- Bugbears (2013, Fika Recordings) – with The Short Parliament
- Chants for Socialists (2015, Where It's at Is Where You Are)
- Dubs for Socialists (2015, Where It's at Is Where You Are / Belka)
- Folk Lullabies for Children and the Childless (2015, Belka)
- Florence (2015, Fika Recordings)
- Trains (2016, Static Caravan Recordings / Belka)
- Thankful Villages Volume 1 (2016, Rivertones)
- Thankful Villages Volume 2 (2017, Rivertones)
- Thankful Villages Volume 3 (2018, Belka)
- Get Out of the Way (2018, Where It's at Is Where You Are)
- 12 Astronauts (2019, Where It's at Is Where You Are)
- Songs of High Altitude (2019, Gare du Nord)
- I Can Travel Through Time (10 songs on 33 rpm 7"; 2020, Formosa Punk)
- Home Time (2020, Fika Recordings)
- You Will Not Die (2022, Fika Recordings)
- Amazing Things (2025, Where It's at Is Where You Are) – as Darren Hayman & his Electric Guitars
- I'm Your Team (2026, Audio Antihero)

=== EPs ===
- Caravan Songs (2005, Static Caravan Recordings)
- Cortinaland (2005, Acuarela Discos)
- Ukulele Songs From the North Devon Coast (2006, Static Caravan Recordings)
- Eastbourne Lights (2007, Static Caravan Recordings)
- Table for One: the Dessert Menu (2007, Track & Field)
- Minehead (2007, Static Caravan Recordings)
- Songs for Harmonium and Drum Machine (2008, P572)
- Losing My Glue (2009, Track & Field) – with The Secondary Modern
- Calling Out Your Name Again (2010, Fortuna Pop!) – with The Secondary Modern
- I Taught You How to Dance (2011, Fortuna Pop!)
- Christmas in Haworth (2011, Fika Recordings)
- Lido Remixes (2012, Where It's at Is Where You Are / Silver Records)
- The Four Queens (2013, Fortuna Pop!) – with The Long Parliament
- Blue House (2013, Belka)
- Wembley Eiffel Tower (2014, Glass Reservoir)
- Dog E.P. (2014, Where It's At Is Where You Are)
- The Doll's House Room (2020, Belka)
- Actually I Still Really, Really Miss You (2020, Belka)
- Music to Watch News By (2021, Belka)

=== Singles ===
- Bad Policewoman / Your Heart (2007, Unpopular) – with The Secondary Modern
- The Bands That Don't Reform / A Softer Place (2009, Black*Kitten Records) – split single with Antony Harding
- Nothing You Can Do Without It (2009, Fortuna Pop!) – with The Secondary Modern
- Winter Makes You Want Me More (2011, Fortuna Pop!) – with The Secondary Modern
- Farewell Jezebel (2012, Audio Antihero) – with Jack Hayter and Antony Harding
- Let's Surf / Old Man's Hands (2011, Sartorial Records) – split single with Terry Edwards
- I Know I Fucked Up [with Elizabeth Morris] / Who Hung the Monkey [with The Wave Pictures] (2011, Belka / Fortuna Pop!)
- Old Man Don't Waste Your Time / I Don't Want to Get Used to It (2013, Where It's At is Where You Are) – with The Long Parliament
- Boy, Look At What You Can't Have Now / Outside, Looking In (2013, Fortuna Pop!) – with Emma Kupa
- I've Been a Bad, Bad Boy / Big Big Deal (2016, Fortuna Pop!) – with Papernut Cambridge
- I Tried and I Tried and I Failed (2020, Fika Recordings)
- The Joint Account (2020, Fika Recordings)
- I Was Thinking About You (2020, Fika Recordings)
- It's Gotten Quiet Around Here (2025, Where It's at Is Where You Are) – as Darren Hayman & his Electric Guitars
- Nobody You'd Know / Borderline (2025, Where It's at Is Where You Are) – as Darren Hayman & his Electric Guitars
- Little Squirrel, Little Arrow – (2026. Strelka Records)

=== Live albums ===
- Madrid – with The Wave Pictures (2009, Belka)

=== Compilations ===
- Great British Holiday EPs (2008, Belka)
- Lido Field Recordings (2013, Belka)
- The Green and the Grey (2011, Belka) – with The Secondary Modern

== Other projects ==
=== Studio albums ===
- Hayman, Watkins, Trout And Lee – Hayman, Watkins, Trout And Lee (2008, Fortuna Pop! / 2026, Audio Antihero)
- The Hosting Couple – Rotifer (2012, AED Records)
- Cambridge Nutflake – Papernut Cambridge (2013, Gare du Nord Records)
- There's No Underground – Papernut Cambridge (2014, Gare du Nord Records)
- Nutlets 1967-80 – Papernut Cambridge (2015, Gare du Nord Records)
- Love the Things Your Lover Loves – Papernut Cambridge (2016, Gare du Nord Records)
- Other Things Your Lover Loves – Papernut Cambridge (2016, Gare du Nord Records)
- The Hayman Kupa Band – The Hayman Kupa Band (2017, Fika Recordings)
- The Great Electric – The Great Electric (2017, Where It's At Is Where You Are)
- Cambridge Circus – Papernut Cambridge (2017, Gare du Nord Records)
- Outstairs Instairs – Papernut Cambridge (2018, Gare du Nord Records)
- Songs for the Prophets – The Unattached (2019, Where It's At Is Where You Are)
- Nutlets II (1978-2001) – Papernut Cambridge (2019, Gare du Nord Records)
- Channel Suite – Papernut Cambridge (2023, Gare du Nord Records)
- The Great Electric – The Great Electric (2021, Where It's At Is Where You Are)
- Requiem for Dogs – The Unattached (2024, Gare du Nord Records)
- More Breakup Songs – New Starts (2024, Fika Recordings)

=== EPs ===
- The Stereo Morphonium EP – as The Stereo Morphonium (2005, Filthy Little Angels)
- Vostok 5 – Various (Hayman curates and contributes two songs) (2012, Strelka Records)
- EP 1 – The Great Electric (2014, Static Caravan Recordings)
- Brute Love 01 – Brute Love (2015, self-released)
- Brute Love 02 – Brute Love (2015, self-released)
- Brute Love 03 – Brute Love (2015, self-released)
- Rockers Dub / Mirology – Papernut Cambridge (2015, Gare du Nord Records)

=== Singles ===
- Someone To Care For / What Happened (2016, Static Caravan Recordings) – with The Hayman Kupa Band
- Agamemnon Counterpart – The Great Electric (2017, Where It's At Is Where You Are)
- Recognizer – The Great Electric (2017, Where It's At Is Where You Are)
- Vanden Plas – The Great Electric (2021, Where It's At Is Where You Are)
- Under the Striplights (2024, Fika Recordings) – with New Starts
- Asbestos Roof (2024, Fika Recordings) – with New Starts
- A Little Stone (2024, Fika Recordings) – with New Starts
- What I Specifically Love (2024, Fika Recordings) – with New Starts

== Other credits and appearances ==
=== Producer credits ===
- Umbrella Heaven – Light Sleeper (2000, Boogle Wonderland)
- Deletia – Thinking Dogs For The Stupid (2001, Evil World Records)
- Jack Hayter – Practical Wireless (2002, Absolutely Kosher Records)
- ANT – These Long Dark Country Roads (2009, Acuarela Discos) - track 1
- Gavin Osborn – Meeting Your Heroes (2009, Banquet Records)
- The Wave Pictures – Beer in the Breakers (2011, Moshi Moshi Records)
- ANT – Kisses On A Plate / Up On The Downs [Demo] (2011, We Were Never Boring)
- ANT – The Birds Sing Goodnight to You and Me (2012, We Were Never Boring)
- Withered Hand – Inbetweens (2012, Brother & Dad)
- Withered Hand – Heart Heart EP (2012, Fence Records)
- Withered Hand / Owl & Mouse – Black Tambourine / I Want You Around / Cavas Bag (2013, Hangover Lounge)
- The Free Fall Band – The Münster Sights (2014, El Segell Del Primavera)
- Deerful – City Bells (2015, self-released)
- Rozi Plain – Friend (2015, Lost Map Records) - co-recording
- Enderby's Room – Enderby's Room (2017, Fika Recordings)

=== Compilation appearances ===
- Various Artists – Greetings From Bearos (2006, Static Caravan Recordings / Where It's At Is Where You Are / Pickled Egg / Fortuna Pop!) - contributes "8-Bit World"
- Various Artists – Indietracks 2007: An Indiepop Compilation (2007, Indietracks) - contributes "Caravan Song"
- Various Artists – Play Some Pool, Skip Some School, Act Real Cool: A Global Pop Tribute To Bruce Springsteen (2009, Where It's At Is Where You Are) - contributes "Rosalita"
- Various Artists – Folk Acoustics (2010, Lo Editions, Universal Publishing Production Music) - contributes "She Should Know"
- Various Artists – Audio Antihero Presets: "Bob Hope Would." a Japan Relief Effort Compilation (2011, Audio Antihero) - contributes "Lazy Lady Lazy Wife"
- Various Artists – Music and Migration (2010, Second Language) - contributes "Summer Visitors"
- Various Artists – Wrecks Rucks Riots & Resurrection: Songs & Tunes from Leigh Folk Festival (2012, Thames Delta Recording) - contributes "Two Tree Island"
- Various Artists – It's the Taking Part that Counts: A Global Pop Sportsday (2012, Where It's At Is Where You Are) - contributes "Bundle"
- Jack Hayter – The Sisters of St. Anthony (2012, Audio Antihero) - appears on "Farewell Jezebel"
- Various Artists – Ebbsfleet International (2013, Gare du Nord Records) - contributes "Maison du Garde"
- Various Artists – Audio Antihero Presents: "REGAL VS STEAMBOAT" for Rape Crisis (2013, Audio Antihero) - contributes "I Learnt to Leave Well Alone"
- Various Artists – Stars (2018, Where It's At Is Where You Are) - contributes "Blue Tinsel, Red Tinsel"
- Various Artists – xx!! - A Tribute to the James Bond Themes of Dame Shirley Bassey (2020, Where It's At Is Where You Are) - contributes "Goldfinger"

=== Other credits ===
- Piano Magic – There's No Need For Us To Be Alone (1999, Rocket Girl) - vocals (track 1)
- The Wisdom of Harry – Coney Island of Your Mind (2000, Matador Records) - vocals (track 3)
- The Loft – Model Village / Rickety Frame (2006, Static Caravan Recordings) - organ (track 1)
- The Wave Pictures – We Dress Up Like Snowmen / Now You Are Pregnant (2007, Moshi Moshi Records) - backing vocals (track 2)
- The Wave Pictures – I Love You Like A Madman (2008, Moshi Moshi Records) - horn arrangement, horn conductor
- The Wave Pictures – Instant Coffee Baby (2008, Moshi Moshi Records) - backing vocals (track 6)
- The Loves – Three (2009, Fortuna Pop!) - synthesizer
- Ghostwriter – The Continuing Adventures Of The Strange Sound Association (2010, Second Language) - musical assistance
- The Wave Pictures – Susan Rode the Cyclone (2010, Acuarela Discos) - guest performer
- Gospel Music – Duettes (2010, Fierce Panda Records) – vocals (track 4)
- Allo Darlin' – Darren / Wu-Tang Clan (2011, self-released) - artwork and lyricist (side b)
- Thirty Pounds of Bone – I Cannot Sing You Here, But For Songs Of Where. (2013, Armellodie Records)
- Pete Astor – Songbox (2013, Second Language) - performer, artist (disc 2, track 3)
- Oromocto Diamond – Le Choc D'Oromocto (2012, P572) - narrator, keyboards (track 6)
- A Little Orchestra – Josefina (2013, Elefant Records) - vocals (track 2)
- Allo Darlin' – We Come from the Same Place (2013, Fortuna Pop! / Slumberland Records) - liner notes
- Thee Cee Cees – Have an Analysis (2015, Podrophenia Records) - backing vocals (track 2)
- Thee Cee Cees – Solution Songs (2015, Blang Records) - backing vocals (track 2)
- Fay Hallam – House Of Now (2016, Well Suspect Records) - saxophone
- We Show Up On Radar – WSUOR (2016, Hello Thor) - vocals (track 4)
- Bill Botting And The Two Drink Minimums – Better Friends (2017, Where It's At Is Where You Are) - additional recordings
- The Wedding Present – Jump In, The Water's Fine (2019, Come Play With Me) - artwork
- Misha Chylkova – I Will / Will You (2021, Gare du Nord) - bass, piano
- Misha Chylkova – Dancing The Same Dance (2025, Peyote Creativity Contamination System / Gare du Nord Records) - bass, piano, guitar, accordion
- The Wedding Present – Flying Saucer [Live in Buxton] / Science Fiction [Melting Rust Orchestra Remix] (2026, Formosa Punk) - artwork
