= Footprints Through the Snow =

Studio album by ANT
- Released: 2006
- Genre: Indie folk
- Length: 48:37
- Label: Homesleep
- Producer: Antony Harding

Footprints Through the Snow is the second solo studio album released by Antony Harding under the name of ANT, released in 2006 on Homesleep Records.

== Track listing ==
1. "When Your Heart Breaks (Into Many Little Pieces)" – 2:23
2. "In Your Dreams" – 3:15
3. "Slipped Away" – 3:43
4. "She'll Be Home Soon" – 3:20
5. "Spent Too Long Walking With No Heart to Follow" – 4:00
6. "This Goodbye Kiss" – 4:57
7. "Look How Time Flies" – 2:42
8. "Those Memories" – 3:51
9. "Change With the Season" – 4:59
10. "Up Sticks and Go" – 3:59
11. "Haven't You Got Anywhere Left You Can Run To?" – 2:59
12. "We Didn't Move a Muscle" – 4:12
13. "Heading Home" – 4:17
14. "She'll Be Home Soon (demo)" - 3:20 (bonus track - China only)

== About ==
The studio album Footprints Through The Snow was recorded & mixed by Giacomo Fiorenza at the Alpha Dept Studio in Bologna Italy over 8 hot days (with no air conditioning) in August & September 2004 with additional recording by Francesco Donadello & Matteo Agostinelli. It was mastered by Matteo Agostinelli at Alpha Dept Studio in May 2005. The album was released in Italy by Homesleep Records in January 2006 and in Europe in February 2006. It was licensed & re-released by Avant Garden Records in December 2006 in Taiwan and licensed & re-released by Pocket Records/Sounds Good in China in June 2011, with a bonus track and a colour lyric booklet.

== Musicians ==
- Giacomo Fiorenza - bass guitar.
- Sean Newsham - bass guitar (9).
- Emanuele Reverberi - trumpet (9) & violin (3) (5).
- Antony Harding - vocals, nylon acoustic guitar, Wurlitzer piano, Eko steel acoustic guitar, Fender Rhodes piano, conga drums, clavinet, Baby Grand piano, maraca, Ludwig drum kit, Eko Panda 61 organ, Solina String Ensemble & Silvertone electric guitar.

== Press ==
Tender little acoustic vignettes - ROCK MIDGETS.

Close your eyes and breathe it in - SUBBA CULTCHA.

Will make you warm on a winter night - PENNY BLACK MUSIC.

Walking home alone never sounded so desirable - SOUNDSXP.

Enough warmth to see you through to summer - IS THIS MUSIC?
