= Fika Recordings =

- Founded: 2011; 15 years ago
- Founder: Tom Ashton
- Genre: Indie pop, indie rock, folk
- Country of origin: United Kingdom
- Location: London
- Official website: fikarecordings.com

Fika Recordings is an English independent record label founded in London in 2011 by Tom Ashton.

It mostly releases indie pop, indie rock, and folk. The label has put out music by artists like Darren Hayman, Randolph's Leap, Stanley Brinks, and Steven Adams.

Since 2018 the label has run a yearly series of concerts held in London called The Winter Sprinter, after its previously having been helmed by Fortuna Pop! and The Track & Field Organisation. For 2025 Fika enlisted both previous custodians to collaborate on that year's lineup to commemorate 25 years of the event.

On 2 April 2025 Anglo-Australian indie pop band Allo Darlin' released their first song in 9 years, "Tricky Questions", with the label. Then on 7 May they released a second, "My Love Will Bring You Home", and announced that their fourth album, Bright Nights, would be released in the UK on 11 July by Fika.

== Artists with releases on Fika Recordings ==
According to the label's website:

- Adam Ross
- adults
- Alison Eales
- Allo Darlin'
- The Ballet
- Bill Botting & The Two Drink Minimums
- Brutalligators
- Common or Garden
- Crake
- Darren Hayman
- Emma Kupa
- Fightmilk
- Fortitude Valley
- The Hayman Kupa Band
- Jessica's Brother
- The Just Joans
- The Leaf Library
- Let's Whisper
- The Little Hands of Asphalt
- Mammoth Penguins
- Math and Physics Club
- Mikey Collins
- Mirrored Daughters
- New Starts
- Pelts
- Randolph's Leap
- Sekudnerna
- The Smittens
- Stanley Brinks
- Steven Adams
- Sunturns
- Tigercats
- Tullycraft
- We Show Up On Radar
- Withered Hand
