= Allo Darlin' =

British indie pop band

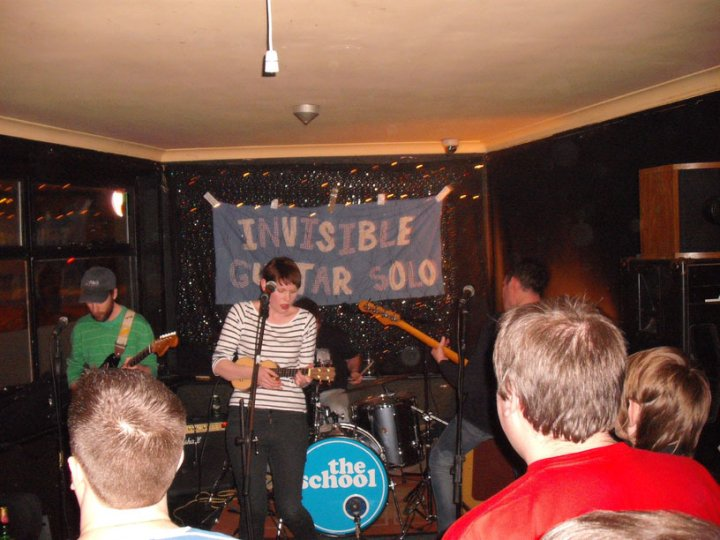
- Allo Darlin' playing in Sheffield, March 2010

Background information
- Genres: Indie pop; indie rock; twee pop
- Years active: 2008–2016, 2023–present
- Labels: Fortuna Pop!; Slumberland; Fika Recordings
- Members: Bill Botting; Michael Collins; Elizabeth Morris; Paul Rains
- Website: allodarlin.com

Allo Darlin' are a British indie pop band based in London, consisting of singer Elizabeth Morris, guitarist Paul Rains, drummer Michael Collins and bassist Bill Botting. They released three albums on independent record labels between 2010 and 2014, before parting ways in 2016. They reformed for concerts in 2023 and announced a fourth album in 2025.

== History ==
Allo Darlin' was started as a solo project by Australian singer and songwriter Elizabeth Morris whilst living in London, England. The band name came from her time working in Soho. "I used to work near the market sellers," she said. "Every day I'd walk past and the old guys would yell out "Allo darlin'" as they ashed into their fruit bowls."

In early 2009, a full band lineup of Allo Darlin' formed with guitarist Paul Rains, drummer Michael Collins and bassist Bill Botting. They released their first single, "Henry Rollins Don't Dance", on WeePOP! Records that summer.

That year Fortuna Pop! signed the band, and they released two singles, "The Polaroid Song" (2009) and "Dreaming" (2010), before the band's self-titled debut full-length, produced by Simon Trought, was released by the label in the summer of 2010.

In 2011 Allo Darlin' self-released the "Darren" / "The Wu-Tang Clan" single, the A-side was a tribute to Darren Hayman, and the b-side was a cover of a song his project The French. The band returned with new album Europe in spring of 2012, released again by Fortuna Pop in the UK and this time by Slumberland in the US.

They spent the next year touring before heading back into the studio to record their third album. We Come from the Same Place was released in October 2014. The band went their separate ways at the end of 2016.

In January 2023, the band announced on social media that they were reuniting for a series of gigs in England, their first in six years, with the intention of recording new music together.

On 2 April 2025 they released their first song in 9 years, "Tricky Questions". Then on 7 May they released a second, "My Love Will Bring You Home", and announced a fourth album, Bright Nights, would be released on 11 July with Slumberland in the US and Fika Recordings in the UK.

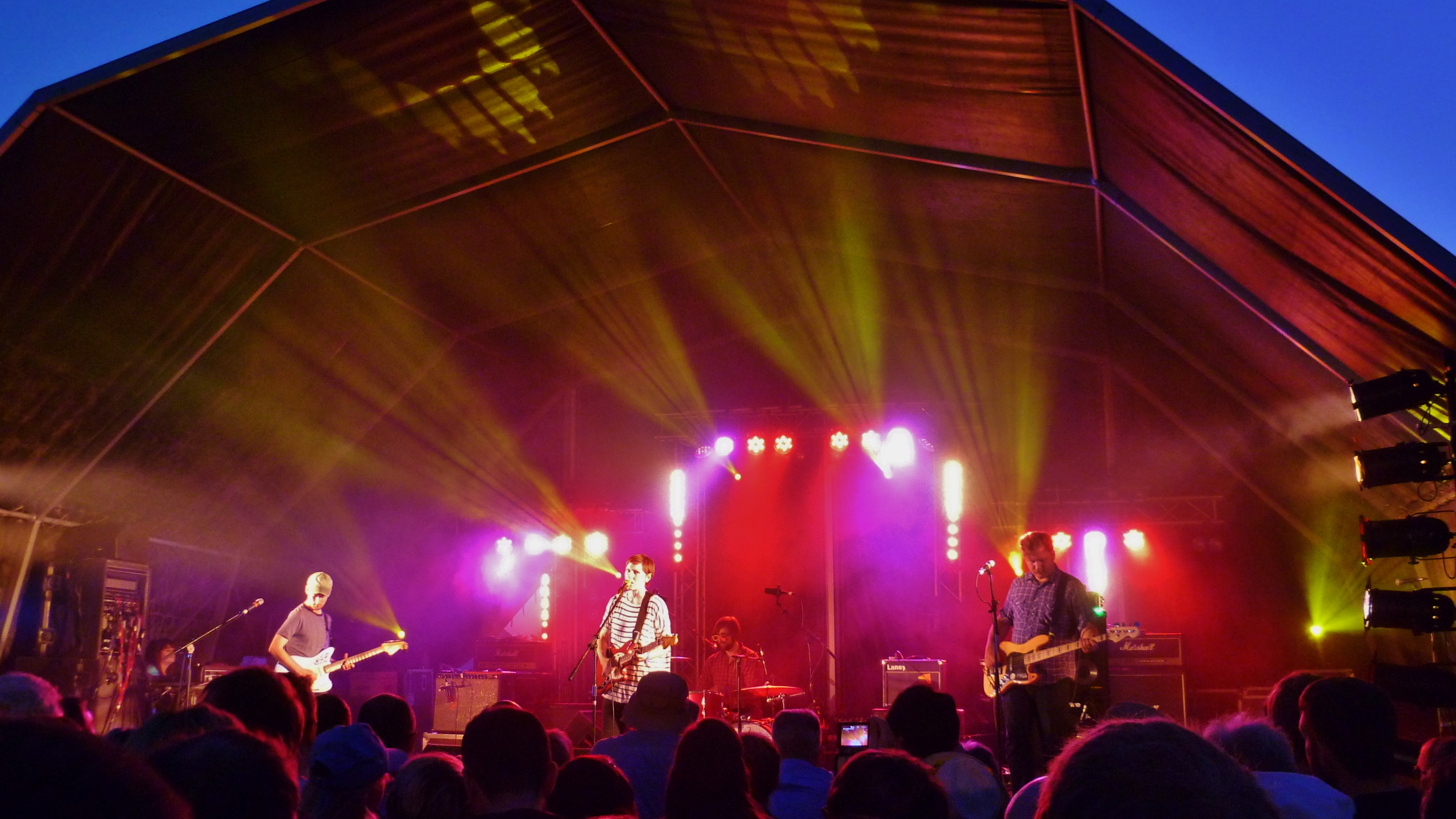
Allo Darlin' at Indietracks 2014

== Members ==
- Elizabeth Morris (vocals and ukulele)
- Paul Rains (guitar)
- Michael Collins (drums)
- Bill Botting (bass)

== Discography ==
=== Albums ===
- Allo Darlin' (Fortuna Pop!, 2010)
- Europe (Fortuna Pop!/Slumberland, 2012)
- We Come from the Same Place (Fortuna Pop!/Slumberland, 2014)
- Bright Nights (Fika Recordings/Slumberland, 2025)

=== Singles ===
- "Henry Rollins Don't Dance" (WeePOP!, 2009)
- "The Polaroid Song" (Fortuna Pop!, 2009)
- "Dreaming" (Fortuna Pop!, 2010)
- "My Heart Is A Drummer" (Fortuna Pop!, 2010)
- "If Loneliness Was Art" (Fortuna Pop!, 2010)
- "Darren" / "The Wu-Tang Clan" (Self-release, 2011)
- "Capricornia" (Fortuna Pop!/Slumberland, 2012)
- "Northern Lights" (Fortuna Pop!/Slumberland, 2012)
- "Europe" (Fortuna Pop!/Slumberland, 2012)
- "Only Dust Behind" (WIAWIYA, 2012)
- "Bright Eyes" (Fortuna Pop!/Slumberland, 2014)
- "Half Heart Necklace" (Fortuna Pop!/Slumberland, 2015)
- "Kings and Queens" (Fortuna Pop!/Slumberland, 2015)
- "Hymn on the 45" (Fortuna Pop!/Hangover Lounge, 2016)
- "Tricky Questions" (Fika Recordings, 2025)
- "My Love Will Bring You Home" (Fika Recordings, 2025)
- "Cologne" (Fika Recordings, 2025)
