= The Track & Field Organisation =

UK record label

The Track & Field Organization
- Founded: 1999
- Founder: Steven Drew, Paul Wright, Russel Duke
- Defunct: 2009
- Distributor: PIAS UK
- Genre: Indie rock
- Country of origin: United Kingdom
- Location: London, England

The Track & Field Organization was a London-based independent record label, founded in 1999 by Steven Drew, Paul Wright and Russel Duke. Originally a club night, Drew and Wright began booking bands, before progressing to starting a label. The label's first release was Kicker's "Said and Done" / "Chancifer" single, in April 2000, and The Tyde's debut album, Once, in March 2001.

== Artists ==
- Beatnik Filmstars
- The Broken Family Band
- The Clientele
- Comet Gain
- Currituck Co.
- Darren Hayman
- Dressy Bessy
- The Essex Green
- Finishing School
- Great Lakes
- Herman Düne
- Homescience
- I Am the World Trade Center
- James William Hindle
- Kicker
- The Ladybug Transistor
- The Loves
- Mahogany
- of Montreal
- The Projects
- The Radio Dept.
- Saloon
- Screen Prints
- Singing Adams
- Saint Thomas
- Tompaulin
- The Tyde

== See also ==
- List of record labels
- List of independent UK record labels
