= Fortuna Pop! =

Fortuna POP! Records
- Founded: 1995; 31 years ago
- Founder: Sean Price
- Defunct: 2018; 8 years ago
- Genre: Indie pop, indie rock
- Country of origin: United Kingdom
- Location: London
- Official website: http://www.fortunapop.com

Fortuna POP! was an English independent record label based in London, started in 1995 by Sean Price. It specialised in indie pop music.

Fortuna POP! previously promoted gigs under the banner of The Beat Hotel and then Basement Scam at the Buffalo Bar in Highbury, London and then promoted events under their own name. The label has been called an "indie institution".

On 31 July 2016, initially via a full page statement in the programme of that summer's Indietracks festival, the label announced that it was to be shut down.

The label was home to both previously established underground acts, such as Darren Hayman, the Wave Pictures and Comet Gain, and breakthrough bands such as the Pains of Being Pure at Heart, Evans the Death and the Spook School.

== Artists on Fortuna POP! ==
- Airport Girl
- The Aislers Set
- Allo Darlin'
- Bearsuit
- The Butterflies of Love
- Cannonball Jane
- The Chemistry Experiment
- Chorusgirl
- Comet Gain
- Crystal Stilts
- Discordia
- Evans The Death
- Fanfarlo
- Finlay
- The Grave Architects
- Darren Hayman
- Joanna Gruesome
- Let's Wrestle
- Simon Love
- The Loves
- The Lucksmiths
- Mammoth Penguins
- Martha
- Milky Wimpshake
- The Pains of Being Pure at Heart
- The Pipettes
- The Primitives
- The Spook School
- September Girls
- Shrag
- Sodastream
- Steven James Adams
- Tender Trap
- Tigercats
- Tullycraft
- Withered Hand
- Would-Be-Goods
