= John Howard (singer-songwriter) =

Musical artist (born 1953)

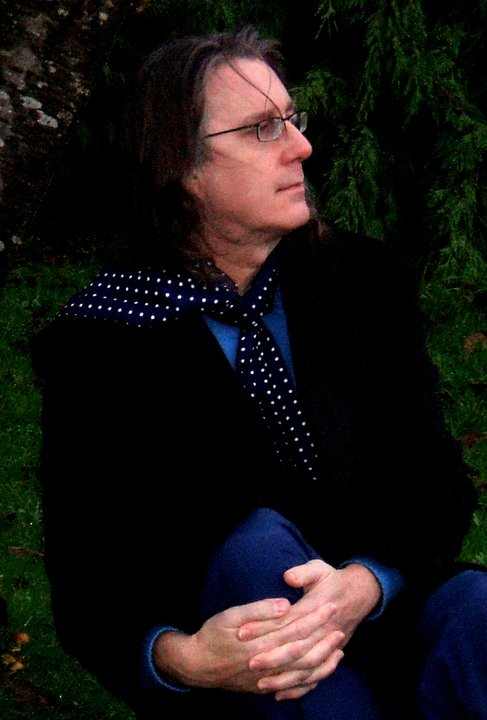
- John Howard in December 2006

Background information
- Born: Howard Michael Jones; 9 April 1953 (age 73); Bury, Lancashire, England
- Genres: Glam, pop, folk
- Occupations: Musician, singer-songwriter, pianist, recording artist
- Instrument: Piano
- Years active: 1970–present
- Labels: CBS, RPM, Cherry Red, Bad Pressings, Euro-Visions, Hanky Panky, Tapete, Kid in a Big World, AWAL, Occultation, You Are The Cosmos, Kool Kat Musik, Think Like A Key Music
- Website: www.kidinabigworld.co.uk

John Howard (born Howard Michael Jones; 9 April 1953) is an English singer-songwriter, pianist and recording artist and published author. With his February 1975 debut album Kid in a Big World (CBS Records), Howard emerged as a late voice of the glam-pop wave of the early 1970s. Across a musical career that has included two main periods of recording activity – 1974-84 and 2004–present – Howard has released 21 studio albums and 12 studio EPs. In March 2018, he became a published author, his first autobiography, Incidents Crowded With Life, covering his childhood up to 1976, was published by Fisher King Publishing. In August 2020, the second volume of his autobiography, Illusions of Happiness, covering the years 1976 - 1986, was published by Fisher King Publishing. In February 2022, the third volume of his autobiography, In The Eyeline of Furtherance, covering 1986 to 2001, was published by Fisher King Publishing. In September 2023, Howard's first novel, Across My Dreams With Nets of Wonder, was published by Fisher King Publishing.

== Beginnings and early years, 1953–1973 ==
John Howard was born Howard Michael Jones in Bury, a market town in North West England which historically is part of Lancashire and administratively is within Greater Manchester.

Having started playing the piano at the age of four years, Howard began classical training at seven. He attended St. Gabriel's Roman Catholic High School in Bury, and in 1969 enrolled at the Accrington College of Art.

Starting in March 1970 and continuing for the next three years, Howard – having adopted the professional moniker "Jon Howard" – played his own songs at universities and folk clubs, and at the Octagon Theatre in Bolton.

At the Octagon, Howard often played support for the folk/progressive rock band Spirogyra. The band at the time was managed by Howard's contemporary, Max Hole, who later, as an A&R manager at WEA Records U.K. in the early 1980s, went on to sign Howard Jones, whose birth name – ironically – is John Howard Jones. Hole went on to serve as chief operating officer of Universal Music Group International.

== CBS Records, 1973–1976 ==
Shortly after moving to London in August 1973, Howard was playing at the Troubadour folk club, when he was spotted by Norman "Hurricane" Smith's manager Stuart Reid, who was the head of pop at Chappell Music. Reid signed Howard to a management contract – changing "Jon" to "John," in the process – and Howard signed with CBS at the end of that year.

Kid in a Big World (1975) was the first of three albums that Howard recorded for CBS in 1974 and 1975. The album – recorded at Abbey Road and Apple Studios – was produced by ex-Shadows drummer Tony Meehan and Paul Phillips. Session players included founding Zombies and Argent keyboardist Rod Argent and founding Argent drummer Bob Henrit.

CBS initially put considerable resources behind its new artist – promoting Howard's debut album with a major print advertising campaign, life-sized cardboard cutouts of Howard at record shops, and a launch concert for recording industry executives and press at the Purcell Room in London's Southbank Centre.

But BBC Radio 1 refused to play the first single, "Goodbye Suzie," calling it "too depressing," and also passed on the second single, "Family Man," calling it "anti-woman."

Following his debut album release in February 1975, Howard recorded two more albums of material for CBS that year. His second album – Technicolour Biography (recorded 1974 and 1975), produced by Paul Phillips – was a collection of songs in a vein similar to those on Kid in a Big World. Indeed, the songs on both of Howard's first two albums were among the group of songs, written between 1970 and 1973, that led CBS to sign Howard in late 1973. But after BBC Radio 1's rejection of the two singles from the debut album, CBS balked at this new set and shelved the project, with the songs never being developed beyond the initial "vocals and piano" demonstrations.

At this point, CBS, anxious for a hit, paired Howard with Biddu, a producer best known for his pioneering work in disco. Howard set about writing a new collection of songs, and the result was his third album, Can You Hear Me OK? (recorded 1975).

CBS's promotion of the only single, "I Got My Lady," from that fully produced third album included Howard's only live television appearance – on a December 1975 episode of the BBC television program The Musical Time Machine, which ran from 1975 to 1977. Also appearing on that episode were Johnny Mathis and Lynsey de Paul. In his first autobiography, "Incidents Crowded With Life", he writes about this appearance Howard recalls that he was greeted by a beaming Lynsey De Paul "Brilliant", she said, "I watched you on my monitor! Such a pro!” "Lovely, John", Patsy, my manager's wife, said, squeezing my arm, "and not a head move anywhere!” "Aren’t you allowed to move your head?” Lynsey asked conspiratorially. "Not if you’re a male performer on a BBC show, apparently", I replied. "Have you seen the dancers on this show?” she laughed. "Try telling them that!”

But when the single did not chart as well as CBS had hoped, CBS shelved that album too. Having failed to find an audience for Howard's music, CBS ultimately released only the first "installment" of Howard's first three albums – sometimes now referred to as the "Kid trilogy." Howard left the label in early 1976.

Stephen Thomas Erlewine called this sequence of events one of the most extreme of examples of Murphy's Law in record company history."

Many years later, Howard's mentor Paul Phillips – who at the time was Howard's producer and A&R manager at CBS – had a more specific explanation. Phillips told Howard that his difficulty in getting radio airplay was due primarily to homophobia in the recording industry. Howard, who is gay, presented a louche and effete image at a time – the early 1970s – when, despite the shattering of gender stereotypes that was being heralded by the emergence of glam and disco, record label executives and radio programmers still often expected gay male artists to conform to traditional ideals of masculinity and to keep their sexuality to themselves. Howard wrote about his experience of this dynamic in his 2007 song, "My Beautiful Days."

== Post-Kid singles, 1977–1984 ==
After leaving CBS, Howard spent a brief time playing London's fashionable restaurants and piano bars – including a regular stint, for several months in 1976, at April Ashley's AD8 club.

In late 1976, Howard suffered a fall in which he broke his back and feet. But after a period of recuperation and recovery, he resumed recording and released a number of singles over the next several years.

Howard's work with the producer Trevor Horn in 1977 and 1978 resulted in two 7" singles – "I Can Breathe Again"/"You Take My Breath Away" (Ariola, 1978) and "Don't Shine Your Light"/"Baby Go Now" (SRT, 1979) – that were among Horn's earliest commercially released production credits.

And a brief return to CBS in late 1979 led to two more 7" singles – "I Tune into You"/"Gotta New Toy" and "Lonely I, Lonely Me"/"Gotta New Toy (remix) – both released in 1980.

In 1981 – the year before Culture Club released its debut album, Kissing to Be Clever – Howard teamed up with Culture Club producer Steve Levine, a collaboration that resulted in another two 7" singles, "It's You I Want"/"Searching for Someone" and "And the World"/"Call on You."

== A second life in A&R, 1985–2000 ==
But by the mid-1980s, Howard had stopped recording and moved to the business side of music, where he forged a successful career in A&R for fifteen years, before "retiring" to Pembrokeshire, Wales, in 2000. Among the artists Howard worked with during this period were: Elkie Brooks, Maria Friedman, Connie Francis, Hazell Dean, Sonia, Gary Glitter, The Crickets, Lonnie Donegan, Madness, Barry Manilow and Sir Tim Rice.

Howard did record one album during this period, The Pros and Cons of Passion. The album – a collection of Howard originals and covers of songs by George Harrison, Brian Wilson, k.d. lang, Stephen Sondheim, Lou Reed, Neil Young, Paul McCartney and Janet Hood/Bill Russell – was slated for 1996 release on the Carlton label. But – as if to remind Howard that Murphy's law still was in effect – the label folded the week before the album's street date, and the album remained unreleased until Howard released it himself in 2008.

== Rediscovering the muse, 2003–2005 ==
The album cover of Kid in a Big World was featured in Matsui Takumi's 2002 book, In Search of the Lost Record: British Album Cover Art of 50's to 80s. This turned out to be one signpost of a revival of interest in Howard's early work. Responding to this, Cherry Red Records subsidiary RPM Records in September 2003 featured "Goodbye Suzie" – the song which, when it was released in October 1974, BBC Radio 1 had scuttled as being "too depressing" – on its compilation Zigzag: 20 Junkshop Soft Rock Singles 1970–1974. Two months later, and nearly thirty years after the album's original release, RPM re-issued Kid in a Big World.

In early 2004, Uncut magazine gave the re-issue a 5-star review, in which reviewer Paul Lester wrote that

Kid in a Big World is a magnificent collection of rococo balladry and florid vignettes from a singer-songwriter who might have rivalled Elton or Bowie had his record company managed to market him right during that strange nether-period between glam and punk.

Howard, wrote Lester, is "the missing link between Noël Coward and ... Momus."

Coward is a frequent reference in reviews of Howard's music. In 2006, a couple of years after the re-issue of Kid, the Manchester poet Robert Cochrane – who collaborated as the lyricist on Howard's 2005 album The Dangerous Hours – observed that Kid is "Noël Coward getting fruit with Elton and Ziggy."

Writing in The Guardian, in 2005, Alex Petridis mused that, when Kid was "[r]eissued to critical raves, its florid, glam piano balladry seemed more contemporary in the age of Rufus Wainwright than it must have done at the height of pub rock."

A few weeks after the Uncut review, a London show by Howard – organized by RPM to celebrate the re-issue of Kid – included in the audience Lawrence of Felt, Peter Astor of The Weather Prophets and rock biographer Nina Antonia, further attesting to Howard's influence.

In 2004 and 2005, respectively, RPM issued the other two (unreleased) albums of the Kid trilogy – Technicolour Biography and Can You Hear Me OK? The first of these prompted a less predictable appearance by Coward, in a review by Anthony Reynolds, who wrote that

Technicolour Biography's "title track...sound[s] like the hangover to the night out of the preceding track. Grand, grand piano and a masterful vocal hinting at distant choirs and philharmonics, telling of wide-screen sagas of beaches and car lots, of premieres at empty cinemas. It's like Coward writes Kerouac."

During this period, Howard entered a second stage of creative output, recording and releasing more than seven albums' worth of new material from 2004 to the present.

In a four-star review of The Dangerous Hours (2005), Howard's collaboration with Robert Cochrane and his first new album release in 30 years, Alexis Petridis wrote in The Guardian that

the intervening decades have done nothing to blunt the edge on Howard's songs. Nor have they dulled the flamboyance of his delivery ... Thirty years on, he still sounds astonishing – a man making up for lost time with enviable panache."

The album, wrote Stephen Thomas Erlewine in his own four-star review, has "all of the hallmarks of [Howard's] '70s work – big, sweeping, cinematic choruses, lush, sighing melodies, music that is once dramatic and intimate," and "Cochrane's words...flow like Howard's own." Musically "spare and simple, just Howard and his piano, occasionally embellished with a synthesizer and overdubbed vocals," the album is "a perfect soundtrack for either late-night introspection or a contemplative Sunday morning. The best thing about The Dangerous Hours...[is] that it proves that his skills as a craftsman are untarnished after all these years."

Later that year, Howard released on RPM parent label Cherry Red what Erlewine called Howard's "true comeback" album, the wryly titled As I Was Saying (2005), the first album collection of new, original all-Howard songs since 1975. The album features ex-Lush bass guitarist Phil King on electric bass and Andre Barreau – who plays George Harrison in the Beatles tribute band The Bootleg Beatles and who also was the lead guitarist on Robbie Williams's 1997 single, "Angels" – on guitars.

"The voice," wrote Helen Wright, "is in peak condition – richer than in his youth but retaining all the character, and sounding more and more like a slightly posher John Lennon." Wright singled out the song "Oh, Do Give It A Rest, Love" – which Dickon Edwards had called the album's "epic centrepiece" – as "a tour-de-force, a seven-minute epic of wit and bitchiness that manages to include pretty well the entire history of pop music."

Erlewine wrote that

Howard's writing is as strong as it was in the '70s – clever...in his lyrics and graceful in his melodies....Howard is clearly an older songwriter, and has become more sentimental with time, but instead of turning him saccharine, it has given him a warm, hazy glow appropriate for his sweet melodicism, which has not diminished over time....[I]t's a quiet, understated gem of a comeback.

== "The songs are still pouring out," 2006–2007 ==
The momentum of new songwriting and recording continued with Howard's next album Same Bed, Different Dreams (2006), released on the small French label Disques Eurovisions. Although the release of Same Bed was delayed until the summer of 2006 – the year after 2005's Dangerous Hours and As I Was Saying – Howard had laid down and sent to Eurovisions demos of all 14 of the album's songs in January 2004. So these actually were the first new songs that Howard recorded after the re-issue of Kid in a Big World in November 2003.

Reviewing Same Bed for the French magazine Les Inrockuptibles, Celine Remy called it "an authentic hidden treasure of eccentric pop: the kind of disc that one could imagine had been reissued as a vestige of a time when Bowie still haunted the cabarets and Elton John preferred writing to shopping," with Matthieu Grunfeld in another French magazine, Magic RPM, suggesting that the album "should find a strong echo among...the fans of Ben Folds."

Howard followed Same Bed, Different Dreams with Barefoot With Angels (2007). Released on the small Spanish label, Hanky Panky Records, the album includes the song, "The Exquisites," that Howard wrote for his 2005 London show at the Glam-ou-rama community's Night of a Thousand Ziggys. John Howard calls the song – which initially was inspired by Oscar Wilde's dictum that "The future belongs to the dandy. It is the exquisites who are going to rule." –

my take on how glam rock saved pop music in the early '70s after the Beatles had left the scene and the '60s had ended with a whimper. T. Rex, Bowie, Roxy Music and their gorgeous chart-colleagues brought fun, great singles and beauty back to a pop scene badly in need of a polish.

Barefoot also includes the song "Magdalena Merrywidow," Howard's tribute to April Ashley.

Howard appeared as a pianist on two other albums in 2007: Anthony Reynolds's British Ballads (Spinney) and Darren Hayman's Darren Hayman and the Secondary Modern (Track & Field). Both albums tapped the contributions of musicians who had been extremely influential in 1980s British indie pop, with the Reynolds album featuring ex-Cocteau Twin Simon Raymonde and the Hayman album featuring Pete Astor, who had founded The Loft and The Weather Prophets.

== Independent releases, 2008–2013 ==
After releasing four new albums on small independent labels from 2005 to 2007, Howard began recording, releasing and selling CDs of his music on his own label, 'John Howard' via his website Kid in a Big World, with digital releases of his entire catalog through AWAL.

Howard's ninth studio album, Navigate Home (2009) – which he wrote while waiting to move from Wales to Spain and completed recording in Spain – was the first album to reflect this new approach. Reviewing the album in Dusty Wright's online pop culture magazine Culture Catch, Robert Cochrane observed:

John Howard has in his early fifties reached a point of creative maturity few achieve, especially after almost twenty-five years in the "dump-bin" and it is a further irony that this album is entitled Navigate Home. During the period of its gestation, he was a temporary resident of transitory homes: the home of the past, the home within his head, and a home as yet unbuilt. Waiting to emigrate to Spain, he realized a series of songs sublimely inhabited by English ghosts, a haunting and restful work, completed and refined in his new country, but without even a hint of sunshine or sangria, only suggestions of clouds and summer showers. Knowing he was leaving England allowed him to plunder his past with a fresh and concise perspective. These songs have a longing and a sense of focused regret. Nostalgia is too obvious and unsubtle a label. There is a strange air of resolution and refinement present. It is a gathering up of half a century's memories, his most personal album so far, but free of anger and misery. Tranquil in tone, but pulled by the magnets of retrospection and anticipation, these songs have a striving but restful nature, a certain sadness, but balanced by a spirit of joyful projection. These are kindly conversations sung into an unsuspecting ear.

In October 2011, Howard released the original demos for Navigate Home as a separate album, Dry Run: The "Navigate Home" Demos. This collection – chronologically, Howard's eleventh studio album – includes demos of two additional songs, "Genius" and "In Your Dreams," that did not make it onto the original album.

Howard's tenth studio album, Exhibiting Tendencies (2011), had its digital release in February 2011 and its CD release in May 2011.

His eleventh studio album, You Shall Go to the Ball! (2012), was released on 24 September 2012. On this 15-track collection, Howard "revisits" and elaborates on nine of his 1970s-era songs that previously had been recorded only as musically spare demos. He interweaves these revisitations with a half-dozen "soundscapes." The result, writes Joe Lepper for the digital magazine Neon Filler, "gives the album a dreamlike, almost Brian Wilson produced feel, with his forgotten songs shining brightly throughout."

John Howard's twelfth studio album, Storeys (2013), was released on 25 November 2013.

In his Pennyblack Music review of the album, Benjamin Howarth writes that, "for all those people who enjoyed the reissues but haven’t heard anything else, his new album Storeys feels like an ideal opportunity to catch up."

Howarth continues:

The process of recording music in studios has become increasingly professionalised. Most studio albums will have been engineered by someone who studiously "knows what they are doing." Indeed, they probably studied what they are doing to degree level. The author Vikram Seth once pointed out that amateur is an abused term. Its root meaning is in fact, "to love." Modern society – driven largely by corporate values – has increasingly twisted it so you automatically associate amateurism with shoddiness.

I write this because John Howard is, now, effectively an "amateur" – he makes his music at home, at his own pace and releases it on his own label. Having once been bound by the requirements of an unappreciative label, he now has only himself to blame if any of his new songs fail to be released. But you'll be amazed at the scale of his ambition on these home recordings. It has become standard to automatically insert the word "humble" before the phrase "home recorded." You wouldn't do that here. Piano and keyboards are the main instruments, but underneath there are lush orchestral strings, multi-layered backing vocals and carefully placed percussion. I get the impression of the kind of reckless, uninhibited inventiveness that made pop music so exciting in the 1960s and 70s.

The songs on Storeys could all have been written and recorded in any decade since the birth of pop music. The show-tune style that made Kid in a World so out-of-place in 1975 and so charming by 2001 has largely been abandoned. Instead, Howard aims for something not dissimilar to Harry Nilsson – that much sought after form of "perfect pop"...that delights record collectors, but rarely seems to catch the ear of average pop fans....

== New collaborators, 2013–present ==
Storeys was the occasion for John's Howard's first live performance in seven years. Earlier in 2013, Howard had been introduced to guitarist and music journalist Robert Rotifer – and it was Rotifer who invited him to perform in London again. The upshot was a November 2013 triple bill with Ralegh Long and Darren Hayman at the North London venue The Servant Jazz Quarters.

For this show, Howard performed with his first live band for many years: Rotifer, Andy Lewis (Paul Weller's bassist) and drummer Ian Button (Papernut Cambridge).

Reviewing Howard's set, Patricia Turk wrote:

And then there was John Howard, and all I could think was "This is how it's done." I swiftly realised we were in the presence of an old-school master. Once touted as the next big thing, his is a story of the almost made it, a tale of the machinations of the music industry, dropped in the 1970s, only to experience a resurrection since the early 2000s, that has included influencing emerging artists like Long.

His are piano-driven pop ballads that I would liken to early Elton John with a bit of Bowie. The songs have a slight glam, show-tunes touch, but they don’t feel dated or twee – instead, it's mood-enhancing music with a story to tell, songs that you feel you've known your whole life.

Building on the success of this show, the four musicians hatched a plan to write and record a new album together. The fruits of their labours, John Howard & The Night Mail, was released in August 2015 on Hamburg-based Tapete Records. It was received with rapturous reviews in Mojo, Record Collector and Q magazine, as well as German Rolling Stone and several online music sites like Drowned in Sound (10 out of 10), musicOMH and Neon Filler.

The band played gigs around Europe in 2016, beginning in Vienna and on to Germany, where they played Augsburg, Hamburg, Cologne and Berlin.

In the Summer of 2016, Howard's first album with the Exeter-based label, Occultation Recordings, Across the Door Sill, was released in October 2016.

In March 2018, Howard's first autobiography, Incidents Crowded With Life, was published by Fisher King Publishing (http://www.fisherkingpublishing.co.uk/ ). The book has been featured in a five-page article in Shindig! magazine, and had very positive reviews from the likes of David Quantick (in Mojo) and Charles Donovan (in Shindig).

In April 2018, Howard's debut album, Kid in a Big World was released on L.P. by Spanish label, You Are The Cosmos. Issued with the same artwork as the original 1975 album, it promises to be a series of releases by Howard on the label, which is run by Pedro Vizcaino in Zaragoza. (http://www.youarethecosmos.com/)

Also in April 2018, You Are The Cosmos put together and released a new collection of John Howard's rarer 1970s recordings, The Hidden Beauty 1973-1979. Featuring tracks produced by Eddie Pumer (Fairfield Parlour), Chris Rainbow and Trevor Horn, the L.P. has become the perfect companion-piece to Kid in a Big World, including tracks recorded leading up to and immediately following the release of that album.

In March 2019, You Are The Cosmos released John's album, Cut The Wire, recorded at his home in Spain during 2018.

In October 2019, John released the EP 'Four Piano Pieces', instrumental meditation pieces.

In August 2020, John's 17th studio album, To The Left of The Moon's Reflection was released in America on Kool Kat Musik, his first release in The States in his 45-year recording career. The album was also issued in the UK on Howard's own label, 'John Howard', with copies of the CD also being available via You Are The Cosmos.

In May 2021, Kool Kat Musik issued the first ever commercially released Best of John Howard, the 2-CD set 'Collected'. It was compiled by Edward Rogers (of duo Rogers & Butler) and mastered by Ian Button (drummer with John Howard & The Night Mail).

In March 2022, Howard released his album LOOK - The Unknown Story of Danielle Du Bois, dedicated to and inspired by John's friend April Ashley. The album's fictitious narrative told how early 1960s pop star Daniel Wood moved to Paris and transitioned into Danielle Du Bois, who became one of society's glitterati, befriending the likes of Brigitte Bardot, Pierre Cardin and Josephine Baker. The album received wide acclaim from many music critics. There is a possibility that LOOK will be turned into a stage musical. LOOK was released by Kool Kat Musik.

The same month in 2022, the third volume of Howard's memoirs, In The Eyeline of Furtherance, was published by Fisher King Publishing, who had published the first two volumes, Incidents Crowded With Life in 2018, and Illusions of Happiness in 2020.

In September 2022, Howard's album From The Far Side of A Near Miss was released. It comprises just one 37-minute song, the title song, inspired by Howard's teenage heroes Roy Harper and The Incredible String Band, who also specialised in longform pieces. The album was released by Kool Kat Musik.

In January 2023, Think Like A Key Music released John's 2019 album, Cut The Wire (which had only previously been available on CD). Then in April that year, Kool Kat Musik issued a double CD set of John's 1975 debut album, Kid In A Big World. The new reissue, Kid In A Big World + The Original Demos, contained on CD2 the previously unreleased demo recordings of the songs John eventually recorded at Abbey Road for the CBS LP. The demos were recorded in 1973 and early 1974 before John went into Abbey Road with producer Tony Meehan. The demos were also released as a single online album, Kid In A Big World: The Original Demos in June '23.

In September 2023, John's first novel, Across My Dreams With Nets of Wonder, was published by Fisher King Publishing (who had also published the three volumes of Howard's memoirs). The book is a time-travel adventure which John wrote between March 2022 and July 2023.

In January 2024, the Double 'A' side single, Safety In Numbers/In The Light of Fires Burning, was released online. The single acted as a trailer for Howard's new album, Single Return, which was issued on CD by Kool Kat Musik in March 2024. The album, which was also released online, features Howard's solo recordings of the songs he wrote with Robert Rotifer, Ian Button and Andy Lewis for the 'John Howard & The Night Mail' album in 2015. Eight of the tracks had never been released before; Small World, the only cover on the album, written by Roddy Frame, was included on the 2021 Best Of 'Collected'; Safety In Numbers and In The Light of Fires Burning had their first release the previous January on the previously mentioned Double 'A' side single.

In the Autumn of 2024, Howard released two singles, Currently/I Am Not Gone, and If There's a Star/Little Prince, both Double 'A' sides. Between these two singles, he also released the EP 'Songs For Mr Feld', featuring five songs written by Marc Bolan during his Tyrannosaurus Rex years.

Through 2024, Howard had also been recording a new album, a collaboration project with poet Robert Cochrane, with whom Howard co-wrote the album The Dangerous Hours, which was released in 2005. The new collaboration album, For Those That Wander By, was released by Think Like A Key Music in February 2025. It was preceded by two singles taken from the album, Losing Myself In Others and Return Postcards, both released in January '25.

In April 2025, Nightschool Records released Howard's 1980 recording, You Will See, on a Double 'A' side vinyl single, with Ian North's We're Not Lonely on the flipside. It was released to promote the upcoming double album compilation All The Young Droids, which featured another of Howard's 1980 recordings, I Tune Into You (which had been issued as a single in March 1980). The album was released in June 2025. You Will See had never had a physical release prior to Nightschool Record's single's release.

In October 2025, Howard released the collection 'Solo', a compilation of some of his piano and voice recordings made since 2007. It was an online only release.

In August 2026, Think Like A Key Music released Howard's brand new album, Overnight Bags, which was precded by two singles taken from the album, 'What God Is This? released in June, and 'Abbey Road, April 1974' released in July.

== Personal life ==
In 2006, Howard and retired theatre actor and director Neil France – Howard's partner of 20 years – were united in a civil partnership ceremony in Pembrokeshire.

The next year, 2007, Howard and France moved from the United Kingdom to Murcia, Spain, where they continue to live.

In May 2015, following the United Kingdom's legalization of same-sex marriage in March 2014, Howard and France had their civil partnership converted to a marriage. The ceremony took place in Anglesey in Wales.

== Discography ==
=== Studio albums ===
- Kid In A Big World (1975 CBS (LP)/2003 RPM/ Cherry Red Records (CD)/2018 You Are The Cosmos (LP)/2007 John Howard/AWAL (Online))
- Technicolour Biography (1974/5 Recorded for CBS/2004 First Release RPM/ Cherry Red Records (CD)/2007 John Howard/AWAL (Online))
- Can You Hear Me OK? (1975 Recorded for CBS/First Released 2005 RPM Cherry Red Records (CD)/2018 You Are The Cosmos (LP)/2010 John Howard/AWAL (Online))
- The Pros And Cons Of Passion (1996 Recorded for Carlton/Released 2008 Kid In A Big World (CD)/2008 John Howard/AWAL (Online))
- The Dangerous Hours (2005 Bad Pressings (CD)/2007 John Howard/AWAL (Online))
- As I Was Saying (2005 Cherry Red (CD)/2010 John Howard/AWAL (Online))
- Same Bed, Different Dreams (2006 Euro Visions (CD)/2006 John Howard/AWAL (Online))
- Barefoot With Angels (2007 Hanky Panky (CD)/2007 John Howard/AWAL (Online))
- Navigate Home (2009 Kid In A Big World CD)/2009 John Howard/AWAL (Online))
- Dry Run: The "Navigate Home" [Demos] (2011 Kid In A Big World (CD)/2011 John Howard/AWAL (Online))
- Exhibiting Tendencies (2011 Kid In A Big World (CD)/2011 John Howard/AWAL (Online))
- You Shall Go To The Ball! (2012 Kid In A Big World (CD)/2012 John Howard/AWAL (Online))
- Storeys (2013 Kid In A Big World (CD)/2013 John Howard/AWAL (Online))
- Hello, My Name Is (2014 Kid In A Big World/2014 John Howard/AWAL (Online))
- John Howard & The Night Mail (2015 Tapete Records (CD/LP/Online))
- Across the Door Sill (2016 Occultation CD/LP/Online/2019 John Howard/AWAL (Online))
- Cut The Wire (2019 You Are The Cosmos (CD)/2019 John Howard/AWAL (Online))
- To The Left of The Moon's Reflection (2020 Kool Kat Musik (CD)/2020 John Howard/AWAL (Online))
- LOOK: The Unknown Story Of Danielle Du Bois (2022 Kool Kat Musik (CD)/2022 John Howard/AWAL (Online))
- From The Far Side of A Near Miss (2022 Kool Kat Musik (CD)/2022 John Howard/AWAL (Online))
- Kid In A Big World: The Original Demos (2023 John Howard/AWAL (Online))
- Single Return (2024 Kool Kat Musik (CD)/2024 John Howard/AWAL (Online))
- For Those That Wander By (2025 Think Like A Key Music (CD/LP)/2025 John Howard/AWAL (Online))
- Overnight Bags (2026 Think Like A Key Music (CD/LP)/2026 John Howard/AWAL (Online))

=== Reissues ===
- Kid In A Big World (2003–2025) UK/Europe: 2003 RPM (CD), 2007 AWAL (Digital), 2018 You Are The Cosmos (Vinyl), Japan: 2018 Air Mail Records (CD), 2023 Kool Kat Musik 2-CD set, 2025 Online-Only, Remastered by Prof. Stoned for Think Like A Key Music
- Can You Hear Me OK? (2005/2018) UK/Europe/USA: 2010 AWAL (Digital), 2018 You Are The Cosmos (Vinyl), 2026 Online-Only, Remastered by Prof. Stoned for Think Like A Key Music
- Cut The Wire UK/Europe/USA: 2023 Think Like A Key Music (Vinyl)

=== Studio E.P.s ===
- Walk on the Wild Side (John Howard/AWAL (digital), 2007)
- My Beautiful Days (John Howard/AWAL (digital), 2007)
- The Bewlay Brothers (John Howard/AWAL (digital), 2007)
- Songs for the Lost and Found (John Howard/AWAL (digital), 2008)
- Songs for a Lifetime (John Howard/AWAL (digital), 2009)
- Atmospheres & Soundscapes (John Howard/AWAL (digital), 2012)
- Loved Songs (John Howard/AWAL (digital), 2013)
- Front Room Fables: Home Demos 1970–1972 (John Howard/AWAL (digital), 2013)
- Songs for Someone (John Howard/AWAL (digital), 2014)
- Songs For Randall (John Howard/AWAL (digital), 2016)
- Songs From The Morning (John Howard/AWAL (digital), 2018)
- Four Piano Pieces (John Howard/AWAL (digital), 2019)
- Songs For Mr Feld (John Howard/AWAL (digital), 2024)

=== Released singles and B-sides ===
==== Solo ====
- "Goodbye Suzie," from Kid in a Big World; Tony Meehan, producer/"Third Man," Paul Phillips, producer (CBS 1974)
- "Family Man," from Kid in a Big World; Paul Phillips, producer/"Missing Key," from Kid In A Big World; Tony Meehan, producer (CBS, 1975)
- "I Got My Lady," from Can You Hear Me OK?; Biddu, producer/"You're Mine Tonight," from Can You Hear Me OK?; Biddu, producer (CBS, 1975)
- "I Can Breathe Again" / "You Take My Breath Away" (Ariola, 1978; Trevor Horn, producer)
- "Don't Shine Your Light" / "Baby Go Now" (double A-side) (SRT, 1979; Trevor Horn, producer)
- "I Tune into You" / "Gotta New Toy" (CBS, 1980; Nicky Graham, producer)
- "Lonely I, Lonely Me" / "Gotta New Toy (remix)" (CBS, 1980; Nicky Graham, producer)
- "Nothing More To Say" (written by Pete Bite) / "You Keep Me Steady" (written by John Howard) (Loose Records, 1984; Pete Bite, producer)
- "Lion in My Winter" / "Take the Weight" (John Howard/AWAL (digital), 2009)
- "The Dilemma of the Homosapien" / "These Fifty Years" (John Howard/AWAL (digital) 2009)
- "Ballad of Sam Mary Ann" (written by John Howard/Robert Cochrane) / "Beautiful Poppies at Even" (written by John Howard/James Lyons) (John Howard/AWAL (digital), 2012)
- "The Deal (Revisited)" / "The Deal (Original 1975 demo version)" (John Howard/AWAL (digital), 2012)
- "I Tune Into You" / "Lonely I, Lonely Me" (original release CBS, March 1980 & August 1980; John Howard/AWAL (digital) double A-sided reissue, 2013)
- "From The Morning" (John Howard/AWAL (digital), 2017)
- "It's Not All Over Yet" (John Howard/AWAL (digital), 2020)
- "In The Stillbeat of A Silent Day" (John Howard/AWAL (digital), 2020)
- "One of Those Pretty Mornings" (John Howard/AWAL (digital), 2020)
- "Christmas Was Made For The Children" / "No Return" (John Howard/AWAL (digital) 2022)
- "Pre-Dawn" / "Jean Genet Just Imagined" (John Howard/AWAL (digital) 2023)
- "Safety In Numbers" / "In The Light of Fires Burning" (John Howard/AWAL (digital) 2024)
- "Currently" / "I Am Not Gone" (John Howard/AWAL (digital) 2024)
- "If There's a Star" / "Little Prince" (John Howard/AWAL (digital) 2024)
- "Losing Myself In Others" (John Howard/AWAL (digital) 2025)
- "Return Postcards" (John Howard/AWAL (digital) 2025
- "You Will See" by John Howard / "We're Not Lonely" by Ian North (Vinyl Double 'A' single) (Schooldaze/Nightschool Records) 2025
- "What God Is This?" (John Howard/AWAL (digital) 2026)
- "Abbey Road, April 1974" (John Howard/ AWAL (digital) 2026)

==== As Quiz (with Steve Levine) ====
- "It's You I Want" (written by John Howard) / "Searching for Someone" (written by Steve Levine/Simon Humphreys) (Satril, 1981; Steve Levine, producer)
- "And the World" (written by John Howard/Steve Levine) / "Call on You" (written by John Howard) (Hit City, 1981; Steve Levine, producer)

John Howard & The Night Mail:

- "Intact & Smiling" (written by John Howard/Andy Lewis) (Tapete Records, July 2015)
- "In The Light of Fires Burning" (written by John Howard/Ian Button) (Tapete Records, February 2016)

=== Collections ===
- Sketching the Landscape: Demos, 1973–1979 (John Howard/AWAL (digital), 2008)
- Creating Impressions: Singles & Rarities, 1980–1990 (John Howard/AWAL (digital), 2008)
- These Fifty Years: The Best of John Howard (John Howard/AWAL (digital), 2009)
- Making Tracks: Curios & Collectables, 2001–2009 (John Howard/AWAL (digital), 2010)
- Not Forgotten: The Best of John Howard Vol. 2 (John Howard/AWAL (digital) (2016)
- The Hidden Beauty 1973-1979 (You Are The Cosmos (Vinyl) 2018)
- Collected - The Best of John Howard (2CD set) (Kool Kat Musik (CD)/John Howard/AWAL (digital)) 2021
- Solo (Online-Only, John Howard/AWAL (digital) (2025)

=== Live albums ===
- In the Room Upstairs: Live at the Briton's Protection (John Howard/AWAL (digital), 2007)
- More from the Room Upstairs: Live at the Briton's Protection (John Howard/AWAL (digital), 2008)
- Live at The Servant Jazz Quarters (John Howard/AWAL (digital), 2014)

=== Compilation appearances ===
==== Original songs ====
- "Goodbye Suzie" on Zigzag: 20 Junkshop Soft Rock Singles, 1970–1974 (RPM/ Cherry Red Records, 2003)
- "Goodbye Suzie" on 15-Track Pick of the Best Recent Music (Uncut magazine, June 2004)
- "Missing Key" on Best of 2004 Reissues, vol. 2 (Uncut magazine, December 2004)
- "Guess Who's Coming To Dinner" on All The Young Droogs (Cherry Red, 2019
- "Small Town, Big Adventures" on Oh! You Pretty Things (Cherry Red, 2021)
- "Kid In A Big World" on Good As Gold (Cherry Red, 2021)
- "Family Man" on Separate Paths (Cherry Red, 2021)
- "Small Town, Big Adventures (Live)" on Pop Aid (Kool Kat Musik, 2022)
- "I Tune Into You" on All The Young Droids (Nightschool Records, 2025)

==== Cover versions ====
- "Beautiful Lies" on Songs for the Next Generation, Michael Weston King tribute album (ARC Music Group, 2007)
- "The Bewlay Brothers" on Rebel Rebel: A Tribute to David Bowie (Uncut magazine, June 2008)
- "Something" on While My Guitar Gentle Weeps: Covers, Curios & the Music That Inspired George Harrison (Uncut magazine, August 2008)
- "No Use" (Ralegh Long cover) and "Creosote Summer" (Rotifer cover) on Ebbsfleet International: Gare du Nord Records Compilation Vol. 1 (Gare du Nord Records, October 2013)
- "No Return" (written by Den Pugsley) on Redrawn - A Tribute To The Pencils (Kool Kat Musik, 2023)
- "The World is Cold Without You" (written by Patrick Campbell-Lyons & Alex Spryropoulos) on Yesterday's Sunshine Today (Think Like A Key Music, 2024)
- "What Are We Doing Here" (written by John Entwistle) on Sing Wistle Tunes (Think Like A Key Music, 2024)

=== Other album contributions ===
- Anthony Reynolds: British Ballads (Spinney, 2007) – piano
- Darren Hayman: Darren Hayman and the Secondary Modern (Track & Field, 2007) – piano
- Alex Highton: Nobody Knows Anything (Gard Du Nord, 2014) - piano
- Papernut Cambridge: Nutlets (Gard Du Nord, 2015) - piano
- The Granite Shore: Suspended Second (Occultation, 2017) - backing vocals, piano
- Ex Norwegian & Friends Sing Jimmy Campbell (Think Like A Key / Beyond Before, 2021) - sung and played piano on one track, "Baby Walk Out With Your Darling Man"
- Radical Friendship Theory (Spinout Nuggets, 2026) - backing vocals, harmonies, piano, and one lead vocal on "Sense of Time" - all songs written by Robert Rotifer

Bibliography (Books Published)

Incidents Crowded With Life (Autobiography), Fisher King Publishing, 2018)

Illusions of Happiness (Autobiography), Fisher King Publishing, 2020)

In The Eyeline of Furtherance (Autobiography), Fisher King Publishing, 2022)

Across My Dreams With Nets of Wonder (Novel), Fisher King Publishing, 2023)

Unexpected Tomorrows (Novel), KDP Amazon Publishing, 2026)
