= Ellis Island Sound =

UK musical ensemble

- Origin: London, United Kingdom
- Genres: Instrumental, electronic, acoustic, folk, alternative
- Label: The Leaf Label
- Members: Peter Astor; David Sheppard
- Website: Official website

Ellis Island Sound are an instrumental band from London, England, consisting of multi-instrumentalists Peter Astor (formerly of the Loft, the Weather Prophets) and David Sheppard (of State River Widening).

== Background ==
The band formed in 1996, and their music varies from electronic-tinged soundscapes to neo-Krautrock and folk and African-tinged reveries.

Astor and Sheppard have also recorded and toured together with Matador recording artists the Wisdom of Harry, while Sheppard makes records with State River Widening and in partnership with SRW's Keiron Phelan (for the Leaf Label) and for Anglo-Spanish group, Continental Film Night (Tinhorn/Dock) amongst others.

As a duo, EIS recorded for labels including All City Chicago, Faux-Lux, Static Caravan, Warp and Island and EMI, as well as remixing for other bands, including the Manic Street Preachers single "Ocean Spray". The band released their debut album, in 2002, which was compiled from these recordings and released by Heavenly/EMI.

This was followed by a limited edition, vinyl-only mini album (Home Service released by Static Caravan in 2003). EIS regrouped to record a self-styled 'agrarian' album, The Good Seed, in 2005. Released in February 2007 on the Peacefrog Records label, it was recorded in a tiny, deconsecrated chapel in the Waveney Valley on the Suffolk/Norfolk border. The Good Seed features twenty rustic-yet-sophisticated new recordings concocted from acoustic instruments that range from parlour guitars and ukuleles to pump harmoniums, dulcimers, goat skin drums and washboards. Recorded on an arcane 8-track tape recorder, it presented a stripped down EIS, though still finds room for such instruments as stylophones, a mini-sampler, a Bentley Rhythm Ace drum machine and miscellaneous noise making devices. Josh Hillman (of the Willard Grant Conspiracy) contributed violin, viola and pedal steel.

On completing the record, Astor and Sheppard expanded the band into a 12-piece 'The Ellis Island Sound Orchestra' for their 2007 tour of UK festivals.

Apart from some low-key appearances on beneath-the-radar compilations, EIS fell largely silent while Astor and Sheppard attended to their other projects. Astor released his Songbox solo album on Second Language in 2010 while Sheppard released an album, under the name Snow Palms, in conjunction with producer Chris Leary, in 2012.

EIS broke cover again in March 2014 with a 12" single, "Intro, Airborne, Travelling", on the Village Green label. A new album, Regions, which fuses Krauftrock, African highlife and dub techniques and featured vocals from Radiohead associate John Matthias, was released on 7 April 2014.

== Discography ==
=== Albums ===
- Ellis Island Sound (2002), Heavenly/EMI
- Home Service (2003), Static Caravan
- The Good Seed (2007), Peacefrog
- Regions (2014), Village Green

=== Singles and EPs ===
- All City EP
- "Data Centre" (1999), Faux-Lux
- "#7 Goes East" (2000), Static Caravan
- "Gene Pool" (2006), Static Caravan
- "Intro, Airborne, Travelling" (2014), Village Green
