= St Mungo's High School =

Coordinates: 56.0063°N 3.7937°W

- St Mungo's School Badge & Exterior

Location
- Merchiston Avenue; Falkirk, FK2 7JT

Information
- Type: Secondary school
- Motto: Let Christ Shine Through You
- Religious affiliation: Roman Catholic
- Patron saint: Saint Mungo
- Established: 1953
- Local authority: Falkirk Council
- Educational authority: Scottish Government
- Head teacher: P Holland
- Chaplain: Parish Priest, St Francis Xavier's Church
- Secondary years taught: S1-S6
- Enrollment: 1,230 students (2021–22)
- Campuses: Former building (1953–2009), New building (2009–present)
- Houses: Andrew; Columba; Ogilvie; Margaret; Kentigern; Ninian
- Colour: Dark Green
- Accreditation: Microsoft Showcase School 2019; Digital Schools Award
- Feeder schools: St Francis Xavier's; St Andrew's; St Bernadette's; St Mary's; St Patrick's; Sacred Heart
- Website: www.stmungoshighschool.co.uk
- Last updated: 3 January 2023

St Mungo's High School is a mixed, Roman Catholic, secondary school in Falkirk, Scotland.

As the only Catholic secondary school in Falkirk, St Mungo's attracts students from the entire council area and its six Catholic primary schools. The new St Mungo's High School building was built on the former school's sports pitches, and opened in 2009.

== History ==
The school was named after St Mungo, founder and patron saint of the city of Glasgow.

In 1949 the school was designed by Stirling County artitecht A, J, Smith and was built in the years 1952 and 1953 by Scottish Orlit Co Ltd.

In 1953 the school was formally opened and then was extended in 1958/59 by Scottish Construction Co Ltd.

In 2009, the new school building opened on the former school's sport pitches after Ogilvie construction rebuilt three local schools including St Mungo's High School under Falkirk Council's second Public Private Partnership scheme costing £25.4m for the rebuild. The new school houses modern sporting and educational facilities whilst also being sustainable.

== Digital accreditations ==
In 2016 the school became the first in Scotland to completely switch and integrate Office 365 into every school department which in turn gained the school their first Microsoft Showcase Award.

In 2019, St Mungo's won a second Microsoft Showcase Award. It was also one of nine local schools that were awarded a Digital Schools Award by Education Scotland in 2019. The award ceremony was held at St Mungo's in September 2019, where all the schools were officially presented the award.

== Feeder primaries ==
The school is secondary to seven primary schools: St Francis Xavier's, St Joseph's, St Bernadette's, Sacred Heart, St Andrew's, St Patrick's and St Mary's.

== Football teams ==
In 2012 the boys' and girls' football teams won their respective Lloyds TSB Scottish Schools' Shields.

== Incidents ==
In 2013 Andrew Ferguson (17) posted violent and threatening messages about the school and its staff on Twitter. He was ordered to do community service.

In February 2022, an examination of facts hearing at Dunfermline Sheriff Court found that Thomas Black, 73, had sexually assaulted four male pupils at the school while he was Head of Biology there between 1978 and 1995. Black was unable to undergo a criminal trial because of health issues, but was placed on the Sex Offenders' Register for five years.

== Notable former pupils ==
- Craig Eddie, winner of the tenth series of The Voice UK.
