= The Voice UK series 9 =

Ninth series of The Voice UK

The Voice UK
- Series 9
- Hosted by: Emma Willis
- Coaches: will.i.am; Meghan Trainor; Sir Tom Jones; Olly Murs
- Winner: Blessing Chitapa
- Winning mentor: Olly Murs
- Runner-up: Jonny Brooks
- No. of episodes: 14

Release
- Original network: ITV
- Original release: 4 January – 14 November 2020

Series chronology
- ← Previous; Series 8 Next → Series 10

The Voice UK is a British television music competition to find new singing talent. The ninth series began airing on 4 January 2020, presented by Emma Willis on ITV. will.i.am, Sir Tom Jones and Olly Murs returned for their ninth, eighth and third series, respectively, as coaches. Jennifer Hudson did not return as a coach for this series and was replaced by singer-songwriter Meghan Trainor. A promotional trailer was released on 6 December 2019.

Due to the COVID-19 pandemic, the semi-final and final of the competition, originally meant to air on 28 March and 4 April, were postponed until November 2020.

In September 2020, ITV revealed that the series would continue in October 2020. However, Trainor digitally coached from the United States because of travel restrictions due to her pregnancy and the ongoing pandemic.

On 14 November 2020, Blessing Chitapa was announced the winner of the series, making her the first winner to be born outside of the UK as Chitapa was born in Zimbabwe. In addition, she became the youngest winner in the show's history based on the year won and the contestant's birth year, surpassing Molly Hocking the year before. Hocking was 18 years, 113 days old when she won on 6 April 2019, and Chitapa was 18 years, 239 days when she won on 14 November 2020, 226 days older than Holly. This also marks the second consecutive, as well as the final win of Olly Murs.

Two contestants of the season would end up representing their countries in the Eurovision Song Contest: Brooke Scullion, who placed third, represented Ireland in the 2022 contest with the song "That's Rich", placing fifteenth in the second semi-final, while Johannes Pietsch, who was eliminated in the knockouts, won the 2025 contest for Austria with the song "Wasted Love" under his stage name JJ, becoming the first ever The Voice UK participant to win the contest.

== Coaches ==
Coaches for series 9 of The Voice UK

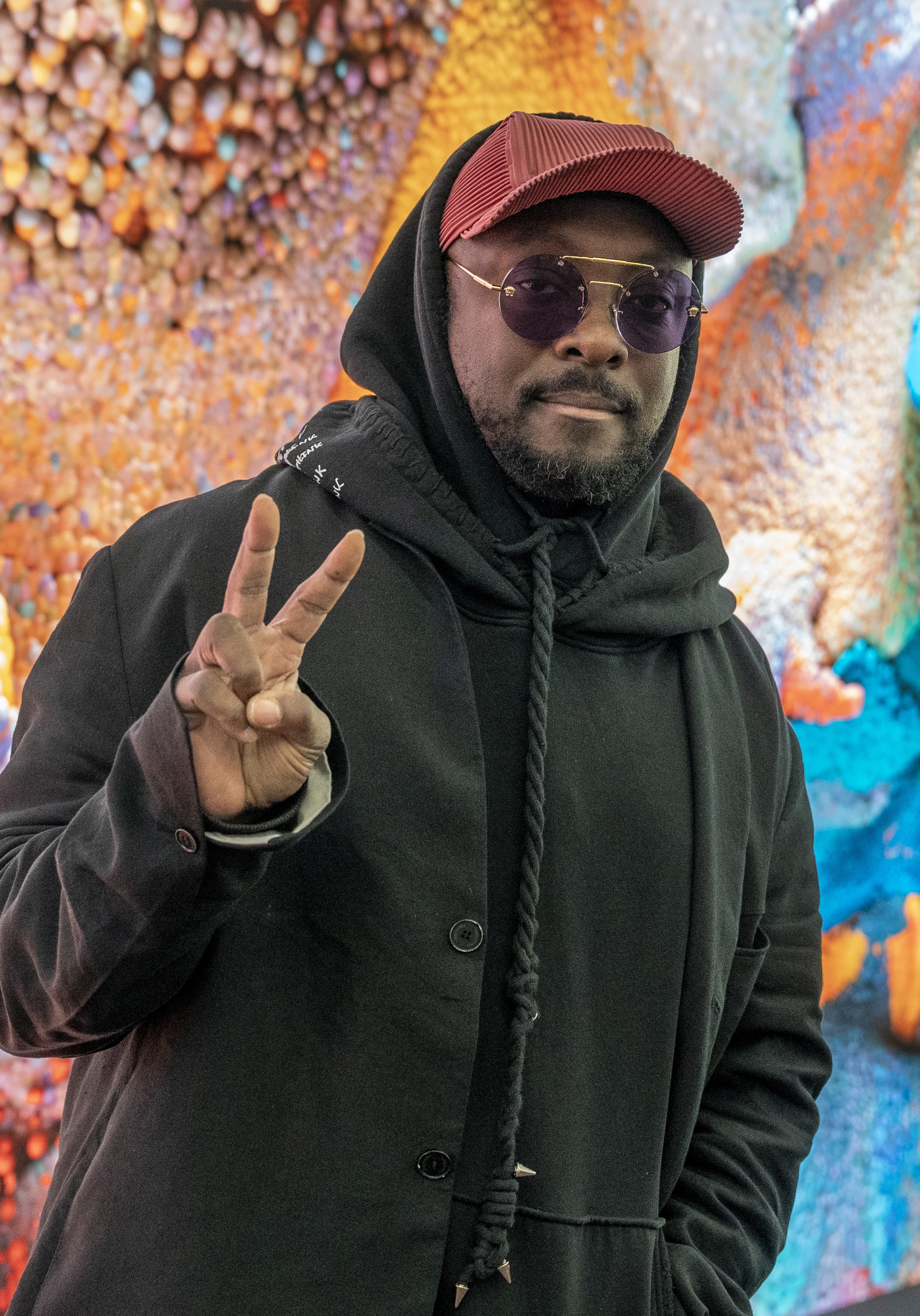
will.i.am

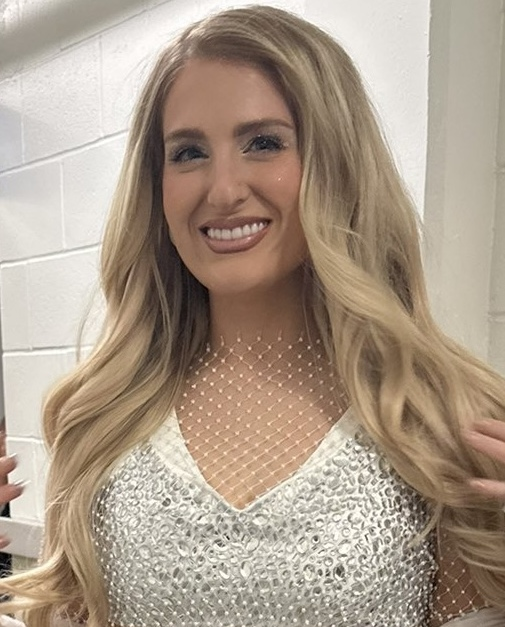
Meghan Trainor

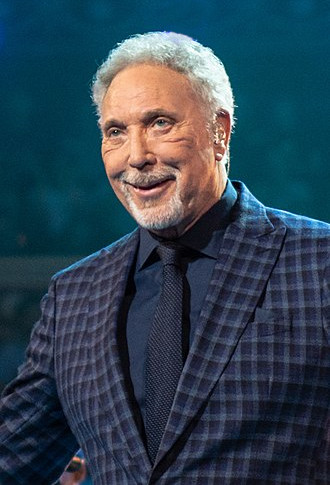
Sir Tom Jones

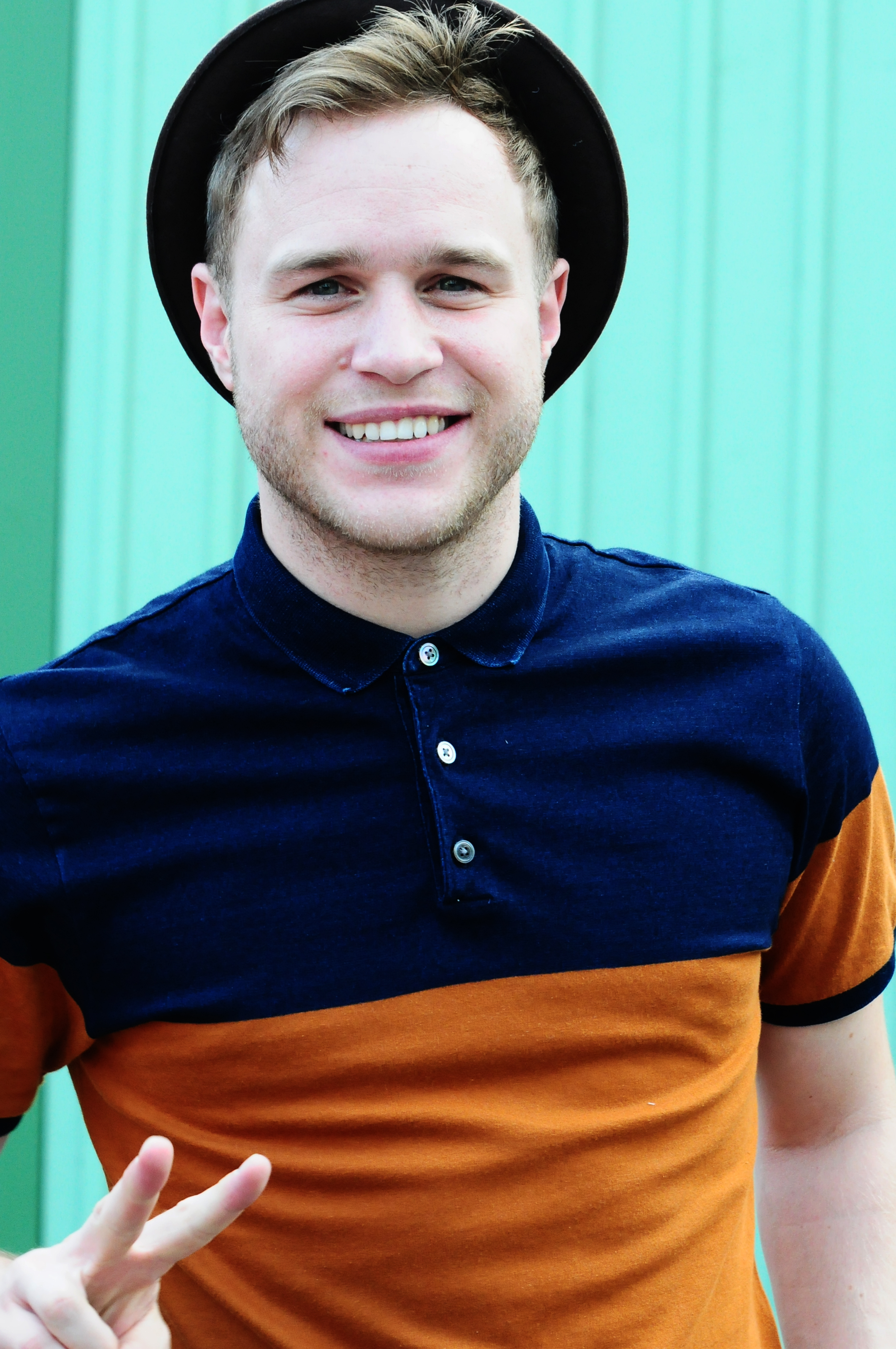
Olly Murs

On 26 September 2019, it was confirmed that will.i.am, Sir Tom Jones and Olly Murs would return to the show as coaches for their ninth, eighth and third series, respectively. They are joined by new coach Meghan Trainor, an American Grammy Award winning singer-songwriter, who replaces former coach Jennifer Hudson. Hudson opted not to return for her fourth series due to filming commitments in the US, which is Cats and Respect. Trainor expressed her excitement at joining the coaching team and commented, "It's a dream come true and I can't wait to sit in the chair with my own button and listen to some incredible new talent!" Alongside the coaches, the return of presenter Emma Willis was announced; she was excited by Trainor's casting.

Trainor later spoke about joining the coaching panel, admitting that she found it "intimidating" and felt "insecure" about what the contestants would think about her, believing she was not as well established in comparison to the rest of the panel. She added that she was nervous about replacing Hudson and asked her for advice on how to approach the show. will.i.am thought it was hard for Trainor to settle into the position because Hudson was well loved on the show, but believed that Trainor would be liked by the audience too. Murs agreed and described Trainor as "a very powerful woman, she's got this great energy about her, she's fun."

== Production ==
Filming for this series commenced on 14 October 2019 at Dock 10 studios with the taping of the blind auditions.

A promotional trailer for the series was released on 6 December 2019, featuring the coaching panel. The series premiered on ITV on 4 January 2020 in the 20:30 timeslot.

On 18 March, it was announced by ITV that the live semi-final which was scheduled for Saturday 28 March, would be postponed until later in the year due to the COVID-19 pandemic. The semi-final eventually was aired on 7 November, and the final on 14 November.

== Teams ==
Colour key:

- Winner
- Runner-up
- Third place
- Eliminated in the Semi-Final
- Eliminated in the Knockouts
- Artist was stolen by another coach at the Battles
- Eliminated in the Battles

Coach	Top 40 Artists					
will.i.am						
will.i.am	Gevanni Hutton	Lucy Calcines	Doug Sure	Johannes Pietsch	Baby Sol	Claudillea Holloway
will.i.am	~~So Diva~~	Shauna Byrne	Alia Lara	Evergreen	Zindzi Thomas	
Meghan Trainor						
Meghan Trainor	Brooke Scullion	Trinity-Leigh Cooper	Oli Ross	Beryl McCormack	Blaize China	Darci Wilders
Meghan Trainor	~~Jordan Phillips~~	~~Claudillea Holloway~~	Katie & Aoife	Holly Scally	Dean John-Wilson	
Tom Jones						
Tom Jones	Jonny Brooks	Lois Moodie	ShezAr	Elly O'Keeffe	Zion	So Diva
Tom Jones	Lara George	Vivienne Isebor	Shaun Samonini	Sean Connolly	Lara Anstead	
Olly Murs						
Olly Murs	Blessing Chitapa	Jordan Phillips	Cameo Williams	Cat Cavelli	Alan Chan	Ty Lewis
Olly Murs	~~Beryl McCormack~~	Belle Noir	Brian Corbett	Millie Bowell	Bleu Woodward	

== Blind auditions ==
Colour key

✔	Coach hit his/her "I WANT YOU" button
	Artist defaulted to this coach's team
	Artist elected to join this coach's team
	Artist eliminated with no coach pressing his or her "I WANT YOU" button
	Artist Received an "All Turn"

=== Episode 1 (4 January) ===
Artist	Order	Age	Song	Coaches and artists choices			
Artist	Order	Age	Song	will.i.am	Meghan	Tom	Olly
Brooke Scullion	1	20	"Bruises"	✔	✔	✔	✔
Adam Howarth	2	27	"Losing Man" (original song)	—	—	—	—
So Diva	3	Various	"Don't Walk Away"	✔	—	✔	—
Francisco Iannuzzi	4	30	"How Come U Don't Call Me Anymore?"	—	—	—	—
Lara George	5	32	"Don't Be So Hard on Yourself"	—	✔	✔	✔
Trinity-Leigh Cooper	6	16	"Stone Cold"	—	✔	—	✔
Cameo Williams	7	18	"Heart of Glass"	—	—	✔	✔
ShezAr	8	31	"A Deeper Love"	✔	✔	✔	✔

=== Episode 2 (11 January) ===
Artist	Order	Age	Song	Coaches and artists choices			
Artist	Order	Age	Song	will.i.am	Meghan	Tom	Olly
Blaize China	1	21	"Instruction"	✔	✔	✔	✔
Ty Lewis	2	18	"When the Party's Over"	—	—	✔	✔
Babalola Ehidiamen	3	25	"A Change Is Gonna Come"	—	—	—	—
Baby Sol	4	36	"Lullaby Of Birdland"	✔	✔	—	✔
Lara Anstead	5	26	"Say You Love Me"	—	—	✔	—
Jay Harvey	6	38	"Woman Trouble"	—	—	—	—
Katie & Aoife	7	16	"Chiquitita"	—	✔	—	—
Zion	8	26	"Glory"	—	—	✔	—

=== Episode 3 (18 January) ===
Artist	Order	Age	Song	Coaches and artists choices			
Artist	Order	Age	Song	will.i.am	Meghan	Tom	Olly
Alan Chan	1	40	"You Know My Name"	—	—	—	✔
Oli Ross	2	21	"Sail"	✔	✔	—	✔
AK	3	24	"Eye of the Tiger"	—	—	—	—
Doug Sure	4	31	"Feels Like Summer"	✔	✔	—	✔
Belle Noir	5	Various	"Feel It Still"	—	—	✔	✔
Jennifer Jamieson	6	26	"Wish You Well"	—	—	—	—
Sean Connolly	7	30	"Suddenly"	—	—	✔	—
Gevanni Hutton	8	17	"Everybody's Free"	✔	—	—	—

=== Episode 4 (25 January) ===
Artist	Order	Age	Song	Coaches and artists choices			
Artist	Order	Age	Song	will.i.am	Meghan	Tom	Olly
Jordan Phillips	1	20	"Found What I've Been Looking For"	—	✔	—	—
Cat Cavelli	2	29	"I Put a Spell on You"	✔	—	—	✔
Grant Tuffs	3	29	"Sucker"	—	—	—	—
Brian Corbett	4	29	"Give Me Love"	—	—	—	✔
Elly O'Keeffe	5	31	"River"	—	✔	✔	✔
Natalie Good	6	24	"Shout Out To My Ex"	—	—	—	—
Johannes Pietsch	7	18	"The Sound of Music"	✔	—	—	—
Lois Moodie	8	21	"I Was Here"	✔	—	✔	✔

=== Episode 5 (1 February) ===
Artist	Order	Age	Song	Coaches and artists choices			
Artist	Order	Age	Song	will.i.am	Meghan	Tom	Olly
Darci Wilders	1	18	"Can't Help Falling in Love"	—	✔	—	—
Lucy Calcines	2	21	"Mi Gente"	✔	✔	✔	✔
Priscilla Cameron	3	31	"Juice"	—	—	—	—
Zindzi Thomas	4	31	"War Cry"	✔	—	—	—
Julius Cowdrey	5	26	"Take Me Home" (original song)	—	—	—	—
Blessing Chitapa	6	17	"I'd Rather Go Blind"	—	—	—	✔
Holly Scally	7	16	"Lay Me Down"	—	✔	—	✔
Jonny Brooks	8	28	"Sweet Thing"	—	—	✔	✔

=== Episode 6 (8 February) ===
Artist	Order	Age	Song	Coaches and artists choices			
Artist	Order	Age	Song	will.i.am	Meghan	Tom	Olly
Bleu Woodward	1	32	"You Shook Me All Night Long"	—	—	—	✔
Mollie Scott	2	21	"Work It Out"	—	—	—	—
Vivienne Isebor	3	26	"The Weekend"	—	—	✔	—
Alfie Osborne	4	19	"On the Loose"	—	—	—	—
Sally Barrett	5	44	"What You're Made Of"	—	—	—	—
Dean John-Wilson	6	30	"Always Remember Us This Way"	—	✔	✔	—
Andre Sanchez	7	N/A	"When I Was Your Man"	—	—	—	—
Rozzandi	8	N/A	"Señorita"	—	—	—	—
Alia Lara	9	19	"How Do You Sleep?"	✔	—	—	—
Beryl McCormack	10	22	"Turning Tables"	✔	✔	✔	✔

=== Episode 7 (15 February) ===
Artist	Order	Age	Song	Coaches and artists choices			
Artist	Order	Age	Song	will.i.am	Meghan	Tom	Olly
Jamie Deary	1	32	"Leave a Light On"	—	—	—	—
Shaun Samonini	2	33	"In Case You Didn't Know"	—	✔	✔	✔
Shauna Byrne	3	16	"If I Can't Have You"	✔	—	Team full	—
Martina Mennell	4	32	"That's Life"	—	—	Team full	—
Alex Buckley	5	23	"Something"	—	—	Team full	—
Evergreen	6	18–19	"Big Yellow Taxi"	✔	—	Team full	—
Claudillea Holloway	7	24	"Queen of the Night aria"	Team full	✔	Team full	✔
Chris Beynon	8	22	"Stuck on You"	Team full	Team full	Team full	—
Millie Bowell	9	23	"Titanium"	Team full	Team full	Team full	✔

== Battle rounds ==
Colour key

✔	Coach hit his/her "I WANT YOU" button
	Artist won the Battle and advanced to the Knockouts
	Artist lost the Battle but was stolen by another coach and advances to the Knockouts
	Artist lost the Battle and was eliminated

=== Episode 1 (22 February) ===
Order	Coach	Artists		Song	Coaches' and artists choices			
Order	Coach	Artists		Song	will.i.am	Meghan	Tom	Olly
1	Olly Murs	Alan Chan	Bleu Woodward	"If I Could Turn Back Time"	—	—	—	—N/a
2	will.i.am	Doug Sure	Zindzi Thomas	"One"	—N/a	—	—	—
3	Sir Tom Jones	Jonny Brooks	Lara Anstead	"Us"	—	—	—N/a	—
4	Meghan Trainor	Blaize China	Claudillea Holloway	"The Greatest"	✔	—N/a	—	—
5	Meghan Trainor	Oli Ross	Dean John-Wilson	"Take Me to Church"	Team full	—N/a	—	—
6	will.i.am	Johannes Pietsch	Evergreen	"Songbird"	Team full	—	—	—
7	Olly Murs	Blessing Chitapa	Beryl McCormack	"Flying Without Wings"	Team full	✔	—	—N/a

=== Episode 2 (29 February) ===
Order	Coach	Artists		Song	Coaches' and artists choices			
Order	Coach	Artists		Song	will.i.am	Meghan	Tom	Olly
1	Meghan Trainor	Brooke Scullion	Jordan Phillips	"Water Under the Bridge"	Team full	Team full	—	✔
2	Sir Tom Jones	Lois Moodie	Sean Connolly	"Ordinary People"	Team full	Team full	—N/a	Team full
3	Meghan Trainor	Trinity-Leigh Cooper	Holly Scally	"Keep Holding On"	Team full	Team full	—	Team full
4	will.i.am	Lucy Calcines	Alia Lara	"Bounce Back"	Team full	Team full	—	Team full
5	Sir Tom Jones	Elly O'Keeffe	Shaun Samonini	"I Lived"	Team full	Team full	—N/a	Team full
6	Olly Murs	Ty Lewis	Millie Bowell	"If the World Was Ending"	Team full	Team full	—	Team full
7	Sir Tom Jones	Zion	Vivienne Isebor	"My Love Is Your Love"	Team full	Team full	—N/a	Team full

=== Episode 3 (7 March) ===
Order	Coach	Artists		Song	Coaches' and artists choices			
Order	Coach	Artists		Song	will.i.am	Meghan	Tom	Olly
1	will.i.am	Baby Sol	So Diva	"My Lovin' (You're Never Gonna Get It)"	Team full	Team full	✔	Team full
2	Meghan Trainor	Darci Wilders	Katie & Aoife	"I Want It That Way"	Team full	Team full	Team full	Team full
3	Sir Tom Jones	ShezAr	Lara George	"Young Hearts Run Free"	Team full	Team full	Team full	Team full
4	Olly Murs	Cameo Williams	Brian Corbett	"Eternal Flame"	Team full	Team full	Team full	Team full
5	Olly Murs	Cat Cavelli	Belle Noir	"Dance Monkey"	Team full	Team full	Team full	Team full
6	will.i.am	Gevanni Hutton	Shauna Byrne	"Imagine"	Team full	Team full	Team full	Team full

== Knockouts ==
=== Episode 1 (14 March) ===
Order	Coach	Artist	Song	Result
1	Sir Tom Jones	So Diva	"End of Time"	Eliminated
2	Sir Tom Jones	Jonny Brooks	"Don't Let Me Down"	Advanced
3	Sir Tom Jones	Zion	"Pray"	Eliminated
1	Olly Murs	Cat Cavelli	"Careless Whisper"	Eliminated
2	Olly Murs	Jordan Phillips	"Rapture"	Advanced
3	Olly Murs	Cameo Williams	"Wicked Game"	Eliminated
1	will.i.am	Gevanni Hutton	"People Help the People"	Advanced
2	will.i.am	Claudillea Holloway	"Paint It Black"	Eliminated
3	will.i.am	Baby Sol	"Blackbird"	Eliminated
1	Meghan Trainor	Blaize China	"Light It Up"	Eliminated
2	Meghan Trainor	Darci Wilders	"Angel"	Eliminated
3	Meghan Trainor	Trinity-Leigh Cooper	"You Say"	Advanced

=== Episode 2 (21 March) ===
Order	Coach	Artist	Song	Result
1	Sir Tom Jones	ShezAr	"With a Little Help from My Friends"	Eliminated
2	Sir Tom Jones	Elly O'Keeffe	"Halo"	Eliminated
3	Sir Tom Jones	Lois Moodie	"Battlefield"	Advanced
1	Meghan Trainor	Brooke Scullion	"Stay"	Advanced
2	Meghan Trainor	Beryl McCormack	"Because You Loved Me"	Eliminated
3	Meghan Trainor	Oli Ross	"Hurt"	Eliminated
1	Olly Murs	Alan Chan	"Crazy Horses"	Eliminated
2	Olly Murs	Ty Lewis	"I'm So Tired..."	Eliminated
3	Olly Murs	Blessing Chitapa	"We Won't Move"	Advanced
1	will.i.am	Lucy Calcines	"Attention"	Advanced
2	will.i.am	Johannes Pietsch	"The Winner Takes It All"	Eliminated
3	will.i.am	Doug Sure	"Don't Watch Me Cry"	Saved by Lifeline vote

== Live shows ==
=== Results summary ===
Team's colour key
Team Will
Team Meghan
Team Tom
Team Olly

Result's colour key
Artist received the most public votes
Artist received the fewest votes and was eliminated

Weekly results per artist
Contestant	Week 1	Week 2	
Contestant	Week 1	Round 1	Round 2
Blessing Chitapa	Safe	Safe	Winner
Jonny Brooks	Safe	Safe	Runner-up
Brooke Scullion	Safe	Eliminated	Eliminated (Week 2)
Gevanni Hutton	Safe	Eliminated	Eliminated (Week 2)
Doug Sure	Eliminated	Eliminated (Week 1)	
Jordan Phillips	Eliminated	Eliminated (Week 1)	
Lois Moodie	Eliminated	Eliminated (Week 1)	
Lucy Calcines	Eliminated	Eliminated (Week 1)	
Trinity-Leigh Cooper	Eliminated	Eliminated (Week 1)	

==== Week 1: Semi-final (7 November) ====
- Musical guest: Molly Hocking ("After the Night Before")

Order	Coach	Artist	Song	Result
1	Olly Murs	Jordan Phillips	"Power Over Me"	Eliminated
2	Sir Tom Jones	Lois Moodie	"Who You Are"	Eliminated
3	Meghan Trainor	Trinity-Leigh Cooper	"Lose You to Love Me"	Eliminated
4	will.i.am	Doug Sure	"Nice for What"	Eliminated
5	Meghan Trainor	Brooke Scullion	"Nothing Breaks Like a Heart"	Advanced
6	will.i.am	Gevanni Hutton	"Many Rivers to Cross"	Advanced
7	Sir Tom Jones	Jonny Brooks	"Million Reasons"	Advanced
8	will.i.am	Lucy Calcines	"Problem"	Eliminated
9	Olly Murs	Blessing Chitapa	"Without You"	Advanced

==== Week 2: Final (14 November) ====
- Musical guest: Celeste ("A Little Love")

Group performance: The Voice UK coaches - "Saturday Night's Alright for Fighting" (All coaches except Meghan Trainor)

Order	Coach	Artist	First song	Order	Duet (with Coach)	Order	Winners single	Result
1	Meghan Trainor	Brooke Scullion	"Edge of Seventeen"	6	"Giant" (with Ella Eyre)	N/A	N/A	Eliminated
2	will.i.am	Gevanni Hutton	"You've Got a Friend"	7	"No Woman, No Cry"	N/A	N/A	Eliminated
3	Sir Tom Jones	Jonny Brooks	"Falling"	5	"Drift Away"	9	"Torn"	Runner-up
4	Olly Murs	Blessing Chitapa	"Before I Go"	8	"Hold Back the River"	10	"Angels"	Winner

- Due to COVID-19 travel restrictions, Trainor was unable to perform with her artist, so Ella Eyre sang with Brooke Scullion.
- The live final was pre-recorded.
