= Car 67 =

1978 single by Driver 67

Single by Driver 67
- B-side: "Communications Breakdown"
- Released: November 1978
- Genre: Novelty
- Length: 3:14
- Label: Logo
- Songwriters: Paul Phillips; Pete Zorn
- Producer: Tax Loss

Driver 67 singles chronology
"Car 67" (1978)	"Headlights" (1979)

"Car 67" ("six seven") is a novelty song by 'Driver 67' released in November 1978. It was in the UK Singles Chart for twelve weeks, reaching a high of No. 7 in February 1979. The song is a ballad revolving around a cab driver who had split up with his girlfriend the previous day and how he is refusing to make a particular pick-up at 83 Royal Gardens (the passenger, unbeknownst to the controller, is the woman in question). The song is arranged as the taxi driver singing the lyrics, interspersed with the voice of the taxi controller; the latter of whom has a distinctive West Midlands accent.

== Background and release ==
Paul Phillips and his brother-in-law Pete Zorn formed the group Tax Loss in 1976. The band signed with Logo Records in 1978 and whilst negotiating a deal for an album, Phillips wrote "Car 67". At the time, Phillips was a taxi driver, and has described himself as being "so bad as a cabbie, I never earned enough to pay the rent on the radio". He wrote the song within minutes and recorded a demo of it. He showed the demo to Zorn who said that it was missing a middle eight, and then helped come up with it. Phillips then showed the song to Logo with the idea of releasing it as a side project. The record company were very eager to have the song, so in September, Phillips negotiated a three-month deal for the one single, "Car 67", meaning that Logo could have the option to tie down the band for an album, so long as they did so within the three months.

The song was recorded for £800 and released in November 1978. In order to promote the single, Phillips offered a song plugger the publishing on the B-side "Communications Breakdown" (which eventually turned out as £10,000). The plugger was "slow off the mark" and there was nothing for the first few weeks, so Phillips tracked him down and within two weeks, the song was Song of the Week on BBC Radio 1's Kid Jensen Show. In February 1979, Driver 67 performed on Top of the Pops, with Phillips playing both the taxi driver, via video clips, and the switchboard operator, in the studio. This led orders to increase from 5,000 per day to 20,000 per day, which would have made it at least into the top 3 of the singles chart. However, the record company failed to press enough copies and only managed to get a fraction of the 120,000 orders into the shops, meaning that the single actually dropped in position on the chart.

== Afterwards ==
After "Car 67" became a Top-30 hit in January, Logo said they were “picking up its option” for an album. After Phillips told them they were too late, they renegotiated with an advance and a higher royalty for the album. When pay day came, they did not receive any money and Logo told them that the second contract was an extension of the first contract and was exactly the same.

The follow-up single "Headlights" was released in May 1979 and was played once on Radio 1, but was then dropped without any explanation. A final single, "Going My Way", was released after that in August, before the band reverted to Tax Loss and the album Hey Mister Record Man and two other singles were released. The album released had an Americanised version of "Car 67", in which the voice of the controller is an American voice actor.

In August 1980, the Queen Mother announced that "Car 67" was "her favourite pop record", describing it as "telling a warm and human story", and this led the single to be re-released.

== Personnel ==
- Paul Phillips – vocals (the taxi driver)
- Pete Zorn – accordion, saxophone, bass guitar
- Bill Zorn – acoustic guitar
- Richard James Burgess – drums
- Simon Heyworth – engineer
- Produced by Tax Loss, credited as 'It's a Tax Loss Production!'
- Ian Lynn

== Charts ==
=== Weekly charts ===
Chart (1979)	Peak position
Ireland (IRMA)	13
New Zealand (Recorded Music NZ)	43
UK Singles (Official Charts)	7

=== Year-end charts ===
Chart (1979)	Position
UK Singles (BMRB)	89
