= One for the Ghost =

Studio album by Pete Astor
- Released: 16 February 2018
- Length: 35:56
- Label: Tapete Records

Pete Astor chronology
Spilt Milk (2016)	One for the Ghost (2018)	You Made Me (2020)

Singles from One for the Ghost
- 1. "Water Tower" Released: 17 November 2017

Professional ratings
Aggregate scores
Source	Rating
Metacritic	72/100
Review scores
Source	Rating
AllMusic	3.5/5 stars
Clash	8/10
MusicOMH	3.5/5 stars

One for the Ghost is the ninth studio album by English musician Pete Astor. It was released on 16 February 2018, under Tapete Records.

== Critical reception ==
One for the Ghost was met with "generally favorable" reviews from critics. At Metacritic, which assigns a weighted average rating out of 100 to reviews from mainstream publications, this release received an average score of 72, based on 8 reviews. Aggregator Album of the Year gave the release a 77 out of 100 based on a critical consensus of 3 reviews.

== Track listing ==
One for the Ghost track listing
No.	Title	Length
1.	"Walker"	3:30
2.	"Water Tower"	3:35
3.	"One for the Ghost"	3:28
4.	"Golden Boy"	3:22
5.	"Injury Time"	4:01
6.	"Magician and Assistant"	3:15
7.	"Only Child"	3:34
8.	"Tango Uniform"	4:10
9.	"You Better Dream"	3:10
10.	"Dead Fred"	3:51
Total length:		35:56

== Personnel ==
Musicians

- Pete Astor – lead vocalist
- Pam Berry – backing vocals
- Franic Rozycki – bass
- Jonny Helm – drums
- James Hoare – guitar

Production

- Giles Barrett – engineer
- Simon Trought – engineer
