= The Wisdom of Harry =

- Origin: London, England
- Genre: Electronic
- Years active: 1997–2003
- Label: Matador
- Past members: Peter Astor

The Wisdom of Harry was an experimental electronic music ensemble from London, England. The group was formed by Peter Astor, formerly the singer/songwriter of Weather Prophets and The Loft, in 1997 and began doing remixes for musicians such as Cornelius and Andrew Weatherall. The Wisdom of Harry's early singles were collected and released as Stars of Super 8 in 1999 on Matador Records. The band made two further albums for Matador. In 2000, House of Binary in which Astor pursued a combination of instrumental, electronic compositions and more lyric driven, song-based work. In 2003, "Torch Division" marked a return to songs, including a cover of Anne Briggs' "Tangled Man".

== Discography ==
- Staying in with the Wisdom of Harry 10" EP (Lissy's, 1998)
- Stars of Super 8 (Matador Records, 1999)
- "Caesar Boots" (CD single) (Matador Records, 2000)
- "Coney Island of Your Mind" (CD single) (Matador Records, 2000)
- House of Binary (Matador, 2000)
- Torch Division (Matador, 2003)
