= Craig Eddie =

- Born: 21 January 1998 (age 28)
- Origin: New Carron, Falkirk, Scotland
- Occupation: Singer
- Instruments: Guitar, vocals
- Label: Polydor

Craig Eddie is a Scottish singer from New Carron, Falkirk. He won the tenth series of The Voice UK.

== Early life ==
Craig was born in New Carron, Falkirk to Craig and Tracey Eddie, and attended St. Mungo's High School. Before pursuing music, he worked in a call centre, an Asda warehouse and in Greggs.

== Career ==
In 2021, Craig auditioned for the tenth series of The Voice UK, and he was defaulted to Anne-Marie's team. After performing his own composition "Come Waste My Time", he was announced as the winner of the series.

Performed	Song	Original Artist	Result
Blind Audition	"Make It Rain"	Foy Vance	Joined Team Anne-Marie
Battle Rounds	"This City" (against James Robb)	Sam Fischer	Winner
Semi-Final	"lovely"	Billie Eilish and Khalid	Safe
Final	"Train Wreck"	James Arthur	Winner
Final	"Don't Speak" (with Anne-Marie)	No Doubt	Winner
Final	"Come Waste My Time" (original song)		Winner

== Personal life ==
Eddie has anxiety and depression, but says music is his therapy and it gets him through hard times. In 2024, Eddie revealed that he has tinnitus, causing him to cancel several tour dates.

== Discography ==
=== Extended plays ===
Title	Details
Travel	Released: 18 May 2017; Label: Self-released; Format: Digital download, streaming
Scottish Sessions	Released: 19 August 2022; Label: Blackbook Music; Format: Digital download, streaming

=== Singles ===
Title	Year	Peak chart positions	Album
Title	Year	UK Down.	Album
"Take You Back"	2017	—	Travel
"Friend for My Soul"	2019	—	Non-album singles
"Does She Come with a Warning"	2019	—	Non-album singles
"Come Waste My Time"	2021	6	Non-album singles
"The Outside"	2021	—	Non-album singles
"Strive"	2022	—	Non-album singles
"Why"	2022	—	Scottish Sessions
"Warning Sings"	2023	—	Non-album singles
"Elastic Heart"	2023	—	Non-album singles
"Just Leave"	2023	—	Non-album singles
"Mariana Trench"	2023	—	Non-album singles
"—" denotes releases that did not chart or were not released in that territory.
