= Everything Changes, Everything Stays the Same =

Studio album by the Loft
- Released: 14 March 2025
- Length: 38:43
- Label: Tapete

The Loft chronology
Magpie Eyes 1982–1985 (2005)	Everything Changes, Everything Stays the Same (2025)

Everything Changes, Everything Stays the Same is the debut studio album by English indie band the Loft. It was released on 14 March 2025 via Tapete Records in LP, CD and digital formats.

== Reception ==
Professional ratings
Review scores
Source	Rating
AllMusic	4/5 stars
The Arts Desk	4/5 stars
Louder Than War	5/5 stars
PopMatters	7/10

The album received a five-star rating from Louder Than War, whose reviewer Ged Babey noted it as "an old-fashioned sounding record made by grey-haired veterans. But artistically it transcends any record made by anyone else in the same age-bracket, anyone else from the Creation/pre-C86 era, and any indie/guitar band full-stop."

In a four-star review for AllMusic, Tim Sendra opined, the album "changes out youthful angst for grown-up angst as it dials back the guitar noise, couches the vocals in harmonies, and mostly sticks to tracks that amble along gracefully instead of charging ahead willy-nilly."

Kieron Tyler of the Arts Desk rated the album four stars and commented, "The ten new songs on Everything Stays The Same sound reassuringly like the Loft, albeit with a toughened-up sound."

Writing for PopMatters, John Bergstrom assigned it a rating of seven and described it as "a remarkably accomplished, confident debut, yet one that suggests there is still more of the story to be told."

== Track listing ==
Everything Changes Everything Stays the Same track listing
No.	Title	Length
1.	"Feel Good Now"	3:24
2.	"Dr Clarke"	3:24
3.	"Storytime"	4:03
4.	"Ten Years"	3:35
5.	"Killer"	4:00
6.	"Do the Shut Up"	3:12
7.	"Greensward Days"	3:22
8.	"The Elephant"	2:57
9.	"Somersaults"	3:17
10.	"This Machine"	5:29
Total length:		38:43
