= The Voice UK series 10 =

Tenth series of The Voice UK

The Voice UK
- Series 10
- Hosted by: Emma Willis (ITV); AJ Odudu (ITV Hub)
- Coaches: will.i.am; Anne-Marie; Sir Tom Jones; Olly Murs
- Winner: Craig Eddie
- Winning coach: Anne-Marie
- Runner-up: Grace Holden
- No. of episodes: 12

Release
- Original network: ITV
- Original release: 2 January – 20 March 2021

Series chronology
- ← Previous; Series 9 Next → Series 11

The Voice UK is a British television music competition to find new singing talent. The tenth series premiered on 2 January 2021, on ITV. will.i.am, Sir Tom Jones, and Olly Murs returned as coaches for their tenth, ninth and fourth series, respectively. Singer Anne-Marie joined the coaching panel, replacing exiting coach Meghan Trainor. Meanwhile, Emma Willis returned for her eighth series as host.

Filming of the auditions took place in late 2020 at the Dock10 Studios, where COVID-19 safety protocols were introduced; such as the coaches' chairs being socially distanced, a virtual audience and the band wearing PPE. Filming of the Battles and Semi-finals took place in January and February 2021.

On 20 March 2021, Craig Eddie was announced the winner of the series, marking Anne-Marie's first and only win as a coach and the second female coach to win in the show's history, following Jennifer Hudson. She is also the second new coach to win on her first attempt, after Hudson. It was the final series to feature a live final, as from the 11th series onwards, the entire show was filmed in advance prior to broadcast.

== Coaches ==
Coaches for series 10 of The Voice UK

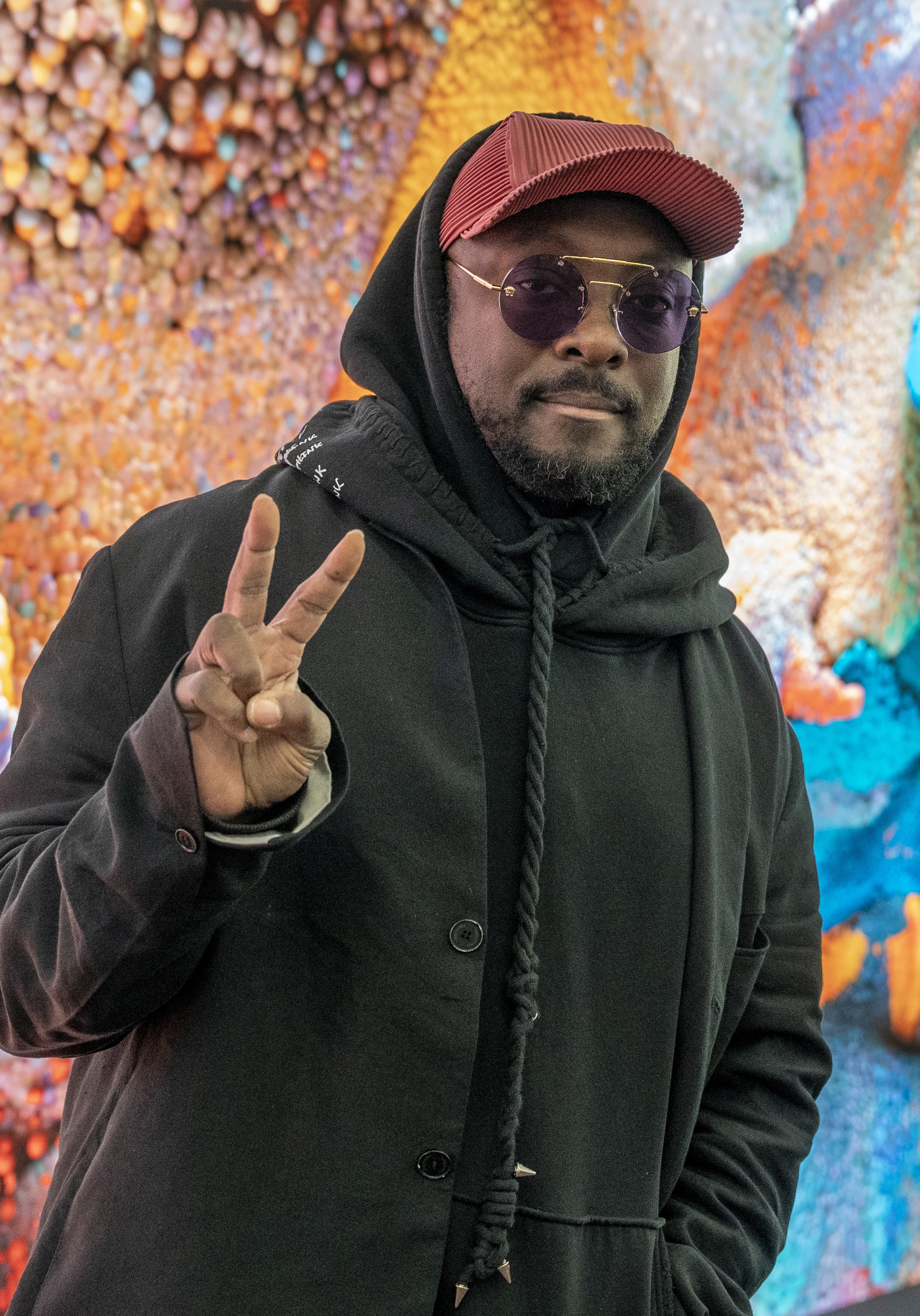
will.i.am

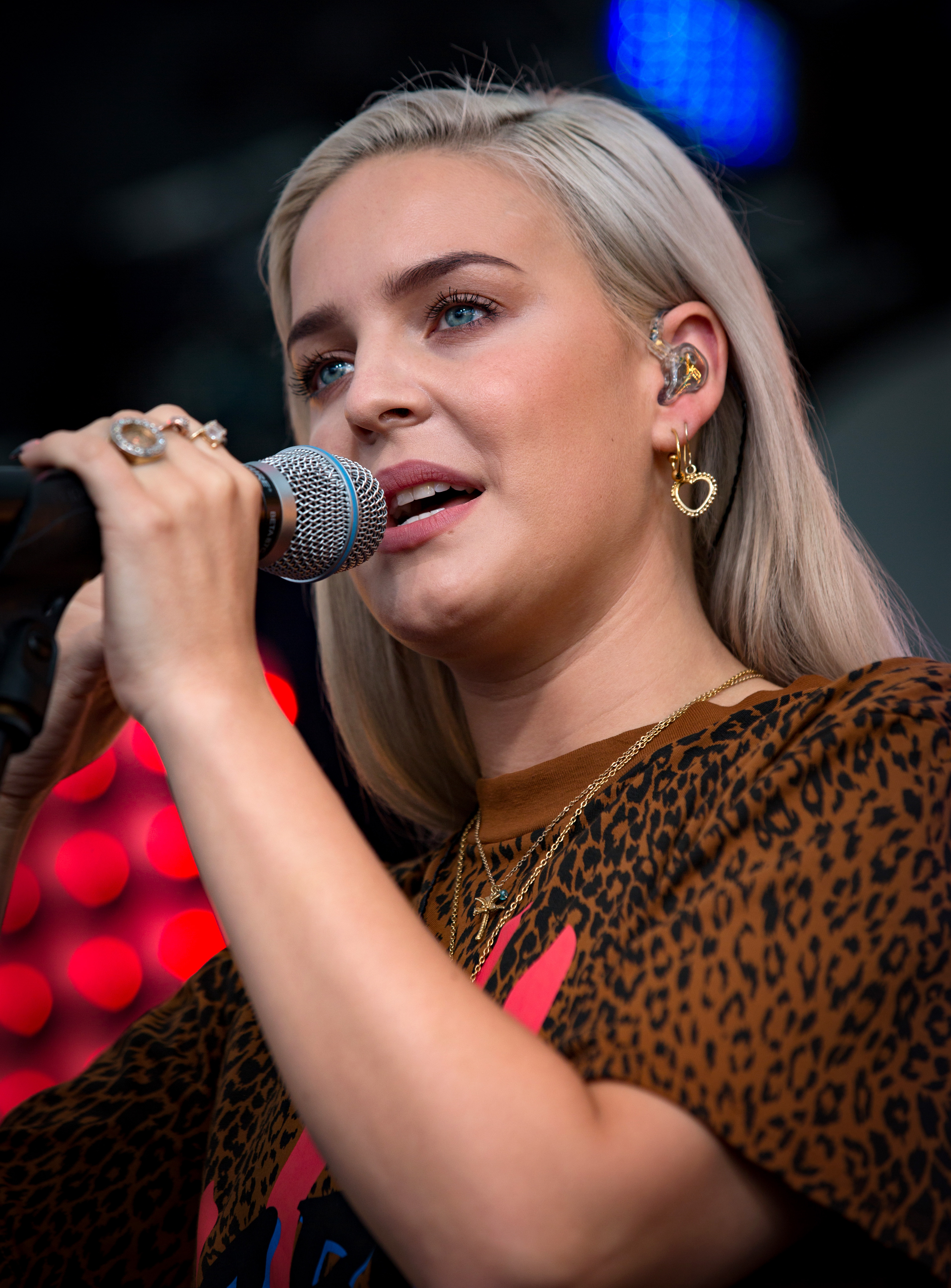
Anne-Marie

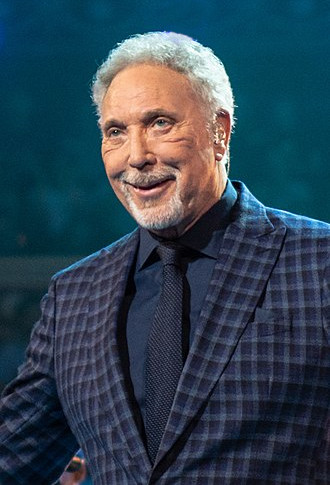
Sir Tom Jones

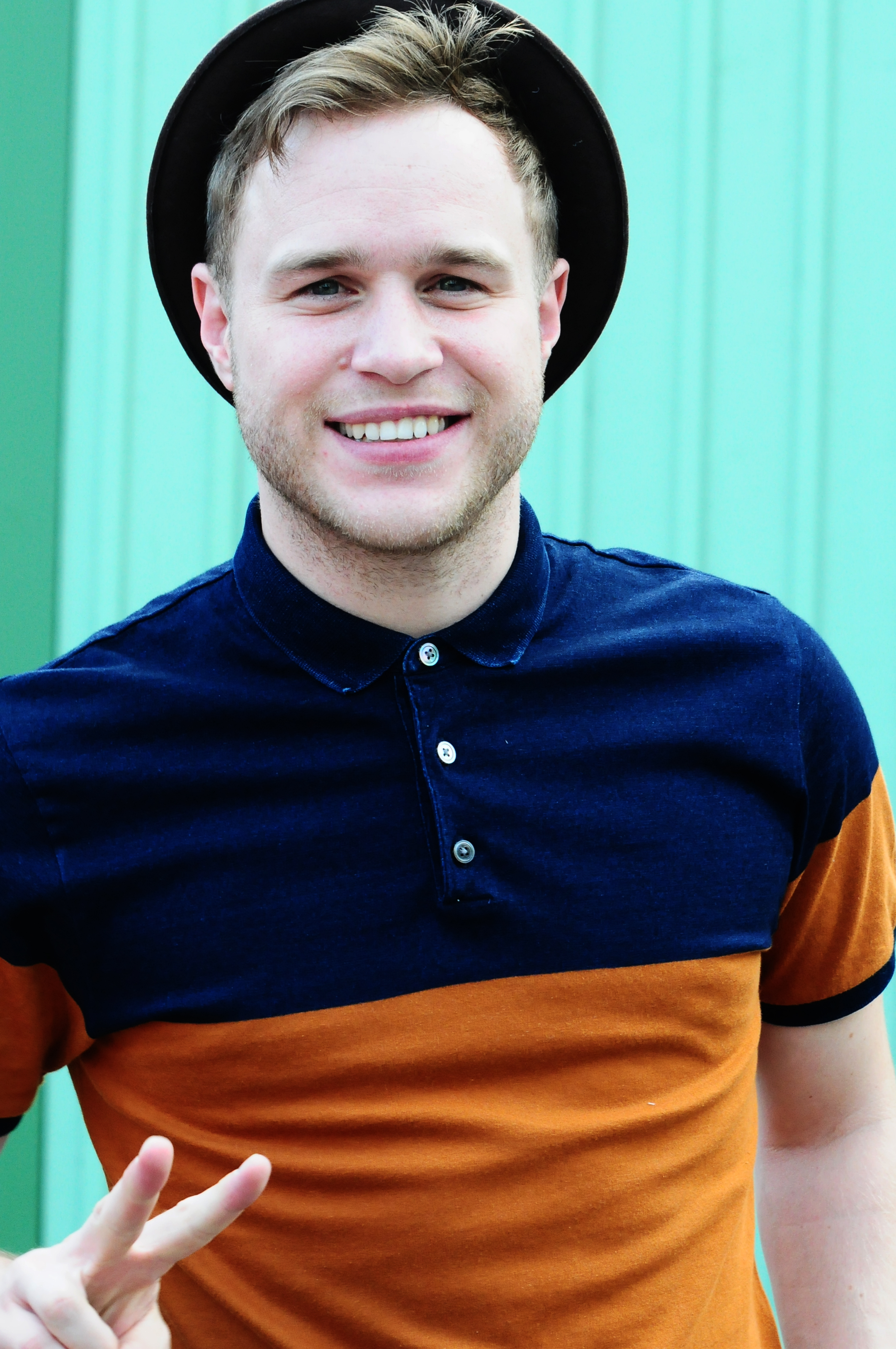
Olly Murs

On 12 October 2020, it was announced will.i.am, Sir Tom Jones and Olly Murs would return to the show as coaches for their tenth, ninth and fourth series, respectively. They are joined by a new coach, singer-songwriter Anne-Marie, who replaces former coach Meghan Trainor, who did not return for her second series due to her pregnancy as well as travel restrictions imposed by the COVID-19 pandemic.

Each coach also had mentors for the semi-finals. Danny O'Donoghue for Team Will, Leigh-Anne Pinnock for Team Anne-Marie, Melanie C for Team Tom, and James Bay for Team Olly.

== Production ==
On 10 December 2020, ITV announced the tenth series of The Voice UK would premiere on 2 January 2021.

ITV also announced the blocked feature would be coming to the blind auditions, which allows for a coach to prevent another coach from getting an artist. Each coach will only receive one block.

== Teams ==
Colour key

- Winner
- Runner-up
- Third place
- Fourth place
- Eliminated by the public vote
- Eliminated in the semi-finals
- Artist was stolen by another coach at the Battles
- Eliminated in the Battles
- Withdrew

Coach	Top 40 Artists					
will.i.am						
will.i.am	Okulaja	Nadia Eide	Jérémy Levif	BrokenPen	Adeniké Adewale	Lauren Drew
will.i.am	Janel Antoneshia	~~Stephanee Leal~~	Victoria Heath	Benjamin Haycock	Kezia	
Anne-Marie						
Anne-Marie	Craig Eddie	Leona Jørgensen	Meg Birch	Wayne & Morgan	Stephanee Leal	Sweeney
Anne-Marie	~~Jason Hayles~~	~~Lauren Drew~~	Cameron Ledwidge	James Robb	Chanel Yates	
Sir Tom Jones						
Sir Tom Jones	Hannah Williams	Benjamin Warner	Jake O'Neill	Leah Cobb	Mariam Davina	Midé
Sir Tom Jones	Wura	Psalm Harmony	Esther Cole	2ché	Sami Nathan	
Olly Murs						
Olly Murs	Grace Holden	Jordan & Wesley	Nathan Smoker	Andrew Bateup	Jason Hayles	Joe Topping
Olly Murs	~~Leah Cobb~~	Matt Croke	Chantelle Padden	Tascha Jerawan	Alex Harry	

== Blind Auditions ==
Blind auditions colour key
✔	Coach pressed "I WANT YOU" button
	Artist defaulted to this coach's team
	Artist elected to join this coach's team
	Artist eliminated with no coach pressing his or her "I WANT YOU" button
	Artist Received an "All Turn"
✘	Coach pressed "I WANT YOU" button, but was "blocked" by another coach from getting the artist
	Blocked by will.i.am; Blocked by Anne-Marie; Blocked by Tom; Blocked by Olly

=== Episode 1 (2 January) ===
First blind auditions results
Artist	Order	Age	Song	Coaches and artists choices			
Artist	Order	Age	Song	will.i.am	Anne-Marie	Tom	Olly
Mariam Davina	1	18	"Anyone"	–	✔	✔	✔
Billy Beech	2	17	"Falling Like the Stars"	–	–	–	–
Nathan Smoker	3	20	"Can't Pretend"	–	✔	✔	✔
Lauren Drew	4	27	"Mamma Knows Best"	✔	✔	✔	✔
Okulaja	5	17	"Everything I Wanted"	✔	–	–	–
Drew Thomas	6	27	"Exile"	–	–	–	–
Jérémy Levif	7	29	"How Long Will I Love You?"	✔	✔	✔	No ^{1}
Hannah Williams	8	38	"Stay with Me"	–	–	✔	✔

- ^1 Tom tried to block Olly, but was not possible, since will.i.am had already blocked him.

=== Episode 2 (9 January) ===
Second blind auditions results
Artist	Order	Age	Song	Coaches and artists choices			
Artist	Order	Age	Song	will.i.am	Anne-Marie	Tom	Olly
Joe Topping	1	42	"Forever Young"	–	–	No	✔
Yana Bing	2	21	"Stupid Love"	–	–	–	–
Esther Cole	3	21	"Let Me Down Slowly"	–	–	✔	✔
Leona Jørgensen	4	26	"Sunflower"	–	✔	–	–
Kezia	5	33	"Your Love Is King"	✔	–	–	–
Kim Jennett	6	25	"Losing My Religion"	–	–	–	–
Matt Croke	7	33	"Come What May"	–	–	–	✔
Benjamin Haycock	8	24	"Restlessness" (original song)	✔	✔	✔	✔

=== Episode 3 (16 January) ===
Third blind auditions results
Artist	Order	Age	Song	Coaches and artists choices			
Artist	Order	Age	Song	will.i.am	Anne-Marie	Tom	Olly
Jordan & Wesley	1	27-30	"Go Get It"	–	✔	–	✔
Chanel Yates	2	21	"Adore You"	–	✔	–	–
Rebecca Watkins	3	30	"Back in Black"	–	–	–	–
Wura	4	31	"Strange"	–	–	✔	–
Sweeney	5	30	"Bad Blood"	–	✔	✔	No
Sonny Price	6	25	"Break My Heart Again"	–	–	–	–
Alex Harry	7	27	"Idontwannabeyouanymore"	–	–	–	✔
Janel Antoneshia	8	27	"Love & Hate"	✔	–	–	✔

=== Episode 4 (23 January) ===
Fourth blind auditions results
Artist	Order	Age	Song	Coaches and artists choices			
Artist	Order	Age	Song	will.i.am	Anne-Marie	Tom	Olly
BrokenPen	1	28	"I Can"	✔	✔	–	–
Leah Cobb	2	16	"Ex's & Oh's"	–	–	–	✔
Laura Sidney	3	25	"With One Look"	–	–	–	–
James Robb	4	27	"Shape of My Heart"	–	✔	–	✔
Midé	5	33	"My Love"	–	–	✔	–
Jamie Leigh Nelson	6	34	"Set You Free"	–	–	–	–
Jake O'Neill	7	23	"I Want Love"	–	–	✔	–
Grace Holden	8	18	"Wherever You Will Go"	–	–	–	✔

=== Episode 5 (30 January) ===
Fifth blind auditions results
Artist	Order	Age	Song	Coaches and artists choices			
Artist	Order	Age	Song	will.i.am	Anne-Marie	Tom	Olly
Benjamin Warner	1	23	"Make Me Feel"	–	–	✔	–
Gwenaelle Noval	2	16	"When We Were Young"	–	–	–	–
Jason Hayles	3	34	"No Church in the Wild"	–	✔	–	No
Joel Baker	4	30	"Nothing Compares 2 U"	–	–	–	–
Adeniké Adewale	5	28	"Get Here"	✔	–	–	–
Andrew Bateup	6	31	"How Am I Supposed to Live Without You"	–	–	✔	✔
Julia Rose	7	18	"Tiny Dancer"	–	–	–	–
Dee Dee Walker	8	24	"Wake Me Up"	–	–	–	–
Cameron Ledwidge	9	18	"Heather"	–	✔	–	–
Victoria Heath	10	37	"One"	✔	–	–	–

=== Episode 6 (6 February) ===
Sixth blind auditions results
Artist	Order	Age	Song	Coaches and artists choices			
Artist	Order	Age	Song	will.i.am	Anne-Marie	Tom	Olly
Meg Birch	1	25	"If I Go"	–	✔	✔	–
Ella Young	2	19	"Defying Gravity"	–	–	–	–
Stephanee Leal	3	25	"Runnin' (Lose It All)"	✔	✔	–	–
Jake McKechnie	4	16	"Broken Strings"	–	–	–	–
Psalm Harmony	5	20-24	"Spirit"	–	–	✔	–
Wayne & Morgan	6	32-43	"Signed, Sealed, Delivered I'm Yours"	–	✔	–	–
Owen Hughes	7	22	"Don't Start Now"	–	–	–	–
Liam Hannigan	8	25	"Let Her Go"	–	–	–	–
Chantelle Padden	9	24	"When I Look at You"	✔	–	–	✔

=== Episode 7 (13 February) ===
Seventh blind auditions results
Artist	Order	Age	Song	Coaches and artists choices			
Artist	Order	Age	Song	will.i.am	Anne-Marie	Tom	Olly
Tascha Jerawan	1	21	"White Flag"	–	–	✔	✔
2ché	2	27	"Heaven"	–	–	✔	Team full
Hannah Hocking	3	30	"All the Man That I Need"	–	–	–	Team full
Nadia Eide	4	32	"Now We Are Free"	✔	✔	–	Team full
Craig Eddie	5	22	"Make It Rain"	Team full	✔	–	Team full
Joanne Harper	6	27	"If I Were a Boy"	Team full	Team full	–	Team full
Adam Strong	7	32	"Rise Like a Phoenix"	Team full	Team full	–	Team full
Nnenna King	8	23	"Lost in Japan"	Team full	Team full	–	Team full
Sami Nathan	9	31	"At Last"	Team full	Team full	✔	Team full

== Battle rounds ==
Battle rounds colour key
✔	Coach hit his/her "I WANT YOU" button
	Artist won the Battle and advanced to the semi-finals
	Artist lost the Battle but was stolen by another coach and advances to the semi-finals
	Artist lost the Battle and was eliminated

=== Episode 1 (20 February) ===
First battle round results
Order	Coach	Artists		Song	Coaches' and artists choices			
Order	Coach	Artists		Song	will.i.am	Anne-Marie	Tom	Olly
1	Anne-Marie	Wayne & Morgan	Lauren Drew	"Respect"	✔	—N/a	—	—
2	will.i.am	Jérémy Levif	Kezia	"Clocks"	Team full	—	—	—
3	Sir Tom Jones	Hannah Williams	Sami Nathan	"Cry Me a River"	Team full	—	—N/a	—
4	Olly Murs	Nathan Smoker	Leah Cobb	"Stop This Flame"	Team full	—	✔	—N/a
5	Anne-Marie	Sweeney	Chanel Yates	"Close"	Team full	—N/a	Team full	—
6	will.i.am	BrokenPen	Benjamin Haycock	"Hall of Fame"	Team full	—	Team full	—
7	Olly Murs	Joe Topping	Alex Harry	"Think Twice"	Team full	—	Team full	—N/a
8	Sir Tom Jones	Benjamin Warner	2ché	"I Knew You Were Waiting (For Me)"	Team full	—	Team full	—
9	will.i.am	Nadia Eide	Stephanee Leal	"Love Is a Battlefield"	Team full	✔	Team full	—
10	Olly Murs	Jordan & Wesley	Tascha Jerawan	"Hello"	Team full	Team full	Team full	—N/a

=== Episode 2 (27 February) ===
Second battle round results
Order	Coach	Artists		Song	Coaches' and artists choices			
Order	Coach	Artists		Song	will.i.am	Anne-Marie	Tom	Olly
1	Olly Murs	Grace Holden	Chantelle Padden	"Breakaway"	Team full	Team full	Team full	—N/a
2	will.i.am	Janel Antoneshia	Okulaja	"If I Ruled the World (Imagine That)"	Team full	Team full	Team full	—
3	Sir Tom Jones	Midé	Esther Cole	"Happier"	Team full	Team full	Team full	—
4	Anne-Marie	Meg Birch	Jason Hayles	"These Days"	Team full	Team full	Team full	✔
5	Sir Tom Jones	Wura	Jake O'Neill	"What's Going On"	Team full	Team full	Team full	Team full
6	Anne-Marie	Craig Eddie	James Robb	"This City"	Team full	Team full	Team full	Team full
7	Olly Murs	Andrew Bateup	Matt Croke	"Always"	Team full	Team full	Team full	Team full
8	Anne-Marie	Leona Jørgensen	Cameron Ledwidge	"Beautiful People"	Team full	Team full	Team full	Team full
9	will.i.am	Adeniké Adewale	Victoria Heath	"Run to You"	Team full	Team full	Team full	Team full
10	Sir Tom Jones	Mariam Davina	Psalm Harmony	"Wonder"	Team full	Team full	Team full	Team full

- Although Janel Antoneshia won the battle, she later withdrew from the show for personal reasons. Will selected Okujala, who Janel had defeated in the battle rounds, to take her place for the semi-final.
- Although Wura won the battle, she later withdrew from the show for personal reasons. Jones selected Jake O'Neill, who Wura had defeated in the battle rounds, to take her place for the semi-final.

== Show details ==
=== Results summary ===
Colour key

- Team Will
- Team Anne-Marie
- Team Tom
- Team Olly
- Artist received the most public votes
- Artist was eliminated

Weekly results per artist
Contestant	Week 1	Week 2	Public vote	Week 3	
Contestant	Week 1	Week 2	Public vote	Round 1	Round 2
Craig Eddie	—N/a	Safe	Safe	Safe	Winner
Grace Holden	—N/a	Safe	Safe	Safe	Runner-up
Hannah Williams	—N/a	Safe	Safe	Eliminated	Eliminated (Week 3)
Okulaja	—N/a	Safe	Safe	Eliminated	Eliminated (Week 3)
Benjamin Warner	Safe	—N/a	Eliminated	Eliminated (Public Vote)	
Jordan & Wesley	Safe	—N/a	Eliminated	Eliminated (Public Vote)	
Leona Jørgensen	Safe	—N/a	Eliminated	Eliminated (Public Vote)	
Nadia Eide	Safe	—N/a	Eliminated	Eliminated (Public Vote)	
Andrew Bateup	—N/a	Eliminated	Eliminated (Week 2)		
BrokenPen	—N/a	Eliminated	Eliminated (Week 2)		
Jake O’Neill	—N/a	Eliminated	Eliminated (Week 2)		
Jérémy Levif	—N/a	Eliminated	Eliminated (Week 2)		
Leah Cobb	—N/a	Eliminated	Eliminated (Week 2)		
Meg Birch	—N/a	Eliminated	Eliminated (Week 2)		
Nathan Smoker	—N/a	Eliminated	Eliminated (Week 2)		
Wayne & Morgan	—N/a	Eliminated	Eliminated (Week 2)		
Adeniké Adewale	Eliminated	Eliminated (Week 1)			
Jason Hayles	Eliminated	Eliminated (Week 1)			
Joe Topping	Eliminated	Eliminated (Week 1)			
Lauren Drew	Eliminated	Eliminated (Week 1)			
Mariam Davina	Eliminated	Eliminated (Week 1)			
Midé	Eliminated	Eliminated (Week 1)			
Stephanee Leal	Eliminated	Eliminated (Week 1)			
Sweeney	Eliminated	Eliminated (Week 1)			

==== Week 1: Semi-final 1 (6 March) ====
Week 1 semi-final results
Order	Coach	Artist	Song	Result
1	will.i.am	Lauren Drew	"Don't You Worry 'bout a Thing"	Eliminated
2	will.i.am	Adeniké Adewale	"I Don't Want to Miss a Thing"	Eliminated
3	will.i.am	Nadia Eide	"The Show Must Go On"	Advanced to the public vote
4	Sir Tom Jones	Mariam Davina	"Breathing Underwater"	Eliminated
5	Sir Tom Jones	Benjamin Warner	"All Night Long (All Night)"	Advanced to the public vote
6	Sir Tom Jones	Midé	"Sweet Creature"	Eliminated
7	Anne-Marie	Leona Jørgensen	"Holy"	Advanced to the public vote
8	Anne-Marie	Stephanee Leal	"Blinding Lights"	Eliminated
9	Anne-Marie	Sweeney	"Cry Me a River"	Eliminated
10	Olly Murs	Joe Topping	"I Won't Give Up"	Eliminated
11	Olly Murs	Jason Hayles	"Bloodstream"	Eliminated
12	Olly Murs	Jordan & Wesley	"The Climb"	Advanced to the public vote

==== Week 2: Semi-final 2 (13 March) ====
Week 2 semi-final results
Order	Coach	Artist	Song	Result
1	Olly Murs	Nathan Smoker	"All Goes Wrong"	Eliminated
2	Olly Murs	Andrew Bateup	"(Everything I Do) I Do It for You"	Eliminated
3	Olly Murs	Grace Holden	"I'm with You"	Advanced to the public vote
4	Sir Tom Jones	Hannah Williams	"Gravity"	Advanced to the public vote
5	Sir Tom Jones	Leah Cobb	"Be My Baby"	Eliminated
6	Sir Tom Jones	Jake O'Neill	"This Year's Love"	Eliminated
7	will.i.am	BrokenPen	"Con Calma"	Eliminated
8	will.i.am	Jérémy Levif	"Always Be My Baby"	Eliminated
9	will.i.am	Okulaja	"Can't Hold Us"	Advanced to the public vote
10	Anne-Marie	Wayne & Morgan	"September"	Eliminated
11	Anne-Marie	Meg Birch	"Why Her Not Me"	Eliminated
12	Anne-Marie	Craig Eddie	"lovely"	Advanced to the public vote

===== Public vote =====
Public vote results
Coach	Artist	Result
will.i.am	Nadia Eide	Eliminated
will.i.am	Okulaja	Advanced
Anne-Marie	Leona Jørgensen	Eliminated
Anne-Marie	Craig Eddie	Advanced
Sir Tom Jones	Benjamin Warner	Eliminated
Sir Tom Jones	Hannah Williams	Advanced
Olly Murs	Jordan & Wesley	Eliminated
Olly Murs	Grace Holden	Advanced

==== Week 3: Final (20 March) ====
- Musical guest: Blessing Chitapa ("I Smile")

Week 3 final results
Order	Coach	Artist	First song	Order	Duet (with Coach)	Order	Winners single	Result
1	Olly Murs	Grace Holden	"Before You Go"	5	"Rule the World"	9	"Dream Catch Me"	Runner-up
2	Sir Tom Jones	Hannah Williams	"Little Runaway"	8	"To Love Somebody"	N/A (already eliminated)		Eliminated
3	will.i.am	Okulaja	"Counting Stars"	6	"Where Is the Love?"	N/A (already eliminated)		Eliminated
4	Anne-Marie	Craig Eddie	"Train Wreck"	7	"Don't Speak"	10	"Come Waste My Time" (original song)	Winner
