= Dean John-Wilson =

British actor (born 1989)

- Born: 6 June 1989 (age 37); Middlesbrough, North Yorkshire, England
- Occupation: Actor
- Years active: 2014–present

Dean John-Wilson (born 6 June 1989) is a British actor. During 2008, he went on Britain's Got Talent, where he was a semi-finalist. He subsequently played the title role in the original West End production of Disney's Aladdin at the Prince Edward Theatre and has continued to appear in musicals.

== Early life ==
John-Wilson was born in Middlesbrough, North Yorkshire. He was brought up by his mother and is British-Cantonese. He used to pick his younger sister up from dance classes, and eventually decided to enroll in them as well. He studied tap, jazz, and gymnastics and did a BTEC in performing arts. Afterwards, he went to London's Mountview Academy of Theatre Arts.

== Career ==
John-Wilson toured the UK with Sister Act and starred as Aquino in Here Lies Love at the National Theatre. He also has appeared in From Here To Eternity in the West End at the Shaftesbury Theatre. He starred in the title role in the original West End production of Disney's Aladdin at the Prince Edward Theatre. In 2016 John-Wilson starred in Miss Atomic Bomb opposite Catherine Tate at the St. James Theatre. The show received poor reviews, including a one star review from The Stage. In mid-2018, he played the role of Lun Tha in the West End revival of The King and I. In February 2020, he appeared in the ninth series of The Voice UK, and in March 2020, he portrayed the role of Mark Casey in an episode of the BBC soap opera Doctors. In 2023 John-Wilson starred as L in a staged concert production of Death Note: The Musical at the London Palladium.

=== Filmography ===
Year	Title	Role	Notes
2018	The King and I	Lun Tha	
2019	We Die Young	Mousey	
2020	Doctors	Mark Casey	TV Series (1 episode)
2024	Masters of the Air	Lt. Clifford	TV Mini Series (4 episodes)

== Personal life ==
John-Wilson dated British actress and singer Cynthia Erivo from 2013 to 2017. Wilson co-starred with Erivo in the stage musical Sister Act.
