= Annatoria =

British singer

- Born: Chinoso Chitapa; 20 March 2002 (age 24); Harare, Zimbabwe
- Origin: Dudley, West Midlands, England
- Genre: Pop
- Occupation: Singer
- Instruments: Vocals
- Years active: 2020–present
- Label: Island (2020–2021)

Chinoso Chitapa known by her stage name, Annatoria (previously known as Blessing Annatoria) is a Zimbabwe-born singer from Russells Hall, Dudley. She won the ninth series of The Voice UK; the winner's single and her debut, a cover version of Robbie Williams' "Angels", charted at number 50 on the UK Singles Download Chart. She attended The Kingswinford School and Dudley College.

== Career ==
=== 2020: The Voice UK ===
In 2020, Chitapa auditioned for the ninth series of The Voice UK, and joined Olly Murs' team. After performing "Angels" by Robbie Williams, she was announced as the winner of the series, signing a contract with Island Records.

Performed	Song	Original artist	Result
Blind Audition	"I'd Rather Go Blind"	Etta James	Joined Team Olly
Battle Rounds	"Flying Without Wings" (against Beryl McCormack)	Westlife	Winner
Knockout rounds	"We Won't Move"	Arlissa	Winner
Semi-Final	"Without You"	Badfinger	Safe
Final	"Before I Go"	Guy Sebastian	Winner
Final	"Hold Back the River" (with Olly Murs)	James Bay	Winner
Final	"Angels"	Robbie Williams	Winner

=== 2021: Count My Blessings ===
On 2 March 2021, Chitapa announced her new song, "I Smile". The song was released on 12 March 2021, as the lead single from her upcoming debut album, Count My Blessings. She performed the song at the final of the tenth series of The Voice UK.

On 30 April 2021, Annatoria's debut album Count My Blessings was released.

In 2021, Annatoria parted ways with Island Records.

=== 2022: New music ===
On 20 March 2022, Annatoria announced her new single "Stay with Me", released on 25 March 2022.

== Personal life ==
Annatoria is a Christian. She is of Zimbabwean descent.

== Discography ==
=== Studio album ===
Title	Album details
Count My Blessings	Released: 30 April 2021; Label: Island; Format: LP, CD, digital download, streaming

=== Extended plays ===
Title	Details
Full Circle	Released: 19 July 2024; Label: Wings; Format: Digital download, streaming
Present Jesu	Released: 15 November 2024; Label: Motown Gospel; Format: Digital download, streaming

=== Singles ===
List of singles, with selected details and chart positions
Title	Year	Peak chart positions			Album
Title	Year	UK DL.	UK Cross	UK Gospel	Album
"Angels"	2020	50	–	–	Count My Blessings
"I Smile"	2021	63	–	–	Count My Blessings
"Stay with Me"	2022	–	–	–	Non-album singles
"Lola"	2022	–	–	–	Non-album singles
"The Divide"	2022	–	–	–	Non-album singles
"Put It On God" (with Limoblaze)	2023	–	–	–	Young & Chosen
"Be Still"	2023	–	–	–	Non-album single
"This Christmas" (featuring Nashe)	2023	86	7	–	Present Jesu
"Love After Hurt" (with Trevor Jackson)	2024	–	–	–	Non-album single
"Packed Up"	2024	–	–	–	Full Circle
"Fountain" (featuring Joe L Barnes)	2024	–	–	–	Full Circle
"Baba" (with Ryan Ofei)	2024	–	–	–	Restore
"Freedom" (with Limoblaze)	2024	–	–	–	Non-album singles
"No Love"	2024	–	–	–	Non-album singles
"In the Middle" (featuring Imrhan)	2025	–	7	8	Non-album singles
"Look Up" (with Sophia Thakur)	2026	–	–	–	Non-album singles
"Fireflies" (with PJ Morton)	2026	–	–	–	Non-album singles
"—" denotes releases that did not chart or were not released in that territory.

==== Promotional singles ====
List of promotional singles
Title	Year	Album
"In Christ Alone"	2021	Count My Blessings
