= House of Binary =

Studio album by The Wisdom of Harry
- Released: August 29, 2000
- Genre: Indie rock, electronica
- Length: 46:43
- Label: Matador

The Wisdom of Harry chronology
Stars of Super 8 (1999)	House of Binary (2000)	Torch Division (2003)

Professional ratings
Review scores
Source	Rating
Allmusic	link

House of Binary is the third album by The Wisdom of Harry, an experimental electronic music ensemble from London.

== Track listing ==
1. "...Hello" (0:41)
2. "Unit One" (3:28)
3. "Coney Island of Your Mind" (4:33)
4. "Caesar Boots" (4:22)
5. "March of the Otaku" (3:11)
6. "Theme from Eggboy" (1:37)
7. "Boxed" (4:31)
8. "Disco C" (4:05)
9. "Woke up Buzzing" (3:24)
10. "Sleepwalking" (3:37)
11. "The Year Without Speaking" (1:36)
12. "I'm Going to Make my Life Right" (3:34)
13. "Palefinger" (3:07)
14. "The Wisdom" (4:57)
