= Paul Phillips (singer) =

- Origin: England
- Occupations: Singer-songwriter, journalist, record producer
- Years active: 1967–present
- Label: CBS · Logo · Pye

Paul Phillips is an English singer-songwriter, former journalist at Music Week, and a former A&R man and record producer at CBS Records.

== Career ==
Phillips began songwriting at age 14 and performed in a band in his hometown of Wolverhampton. This was at a time when even leading acts such as The N'Betweens (later Slade) were doing strictly cover versions. While at CBS Records, he met American musician Pete Zorn, signed to the label with the trio Fishbaugh, Fishbaugh and Zorn. The two hit it off and from then, Zorn was on almost every session where Phillips was producer. They also started demoing their own songs. Phillips trekked around London record companies for nearly three years until he finally landed a deal for him and Zorn with Logo Records, home of The Tourists (later Eurythmics) and Streetband (lead singer, Paul Young).

While arrangements were being made for their debut album, Phillips played Logo's managing director a demo he had made of a novelty song called "Car 67", written during idle moments in a three-month stint as what he has called "possibly the worst cab driver London has ever known". Logo immediately wanted the song as a single. Recorded for £800 and released in late 1978, it went on to sell nearly half a million copies, peaking at number seven in the UK Singles Chart. In its biggest week, orders were coming in for 20,000 copies a day, which would have put it at number one. The pressing plant only managed to press and distribute 20,000 copies and it dropped down to number 11.

The record doomed their career as an act to one-hit wonder status. BBC Radio refused to play the follow-up, "Headlights", because of its controversial content (a truck driver menaces lone girl on isolated back road), and because it was completely at odds with the novelty aspect of "Car 67". A subsequent dispute over royalties dragged on for two years, after which Phillips, completely disillusioned with the record industry, returned to journalism. The album he and Zorn made, Hey Mr Record Man, included a satire on A&R men, and a spoken word playlet in two acts about the end of the world. The album ended with another satire on the illegal copying of music, addressing listeners as "You Stupid Turkeys". The final nail in its coffin was that it included an Americanised version of "Car 67" rather than the original hit Brummie version. The record company buried the album.

Since then, Phillips went on to success as a magazine publisher, and later as a partner in a London design business. He then imported vintage guitars from America.

In February 2012 he released his first album of new material in thirty years. The album, Now That's What I Call Divorce!!!, chronicles the difficulties in, breakup of, and eventual divorce in his second marriage. The songs cover spousal abuse, binge drinking, depression, insomnia and breakup. Recorded entirely at home, using Logic, the album is self-produced and performed.

In 2017 he released the album Breathe, reverting to the performer name Driver 67. At the same time he reissued Now That's What I Call Divorce as Not There Yet, also as performer Driver 67.

Also in 2017, he began mentoring young music hopefuls, mirroring his experience with step-daughter Grace Carter.
