= Pete Astor =

British songwriter and solo artist (born 1960)

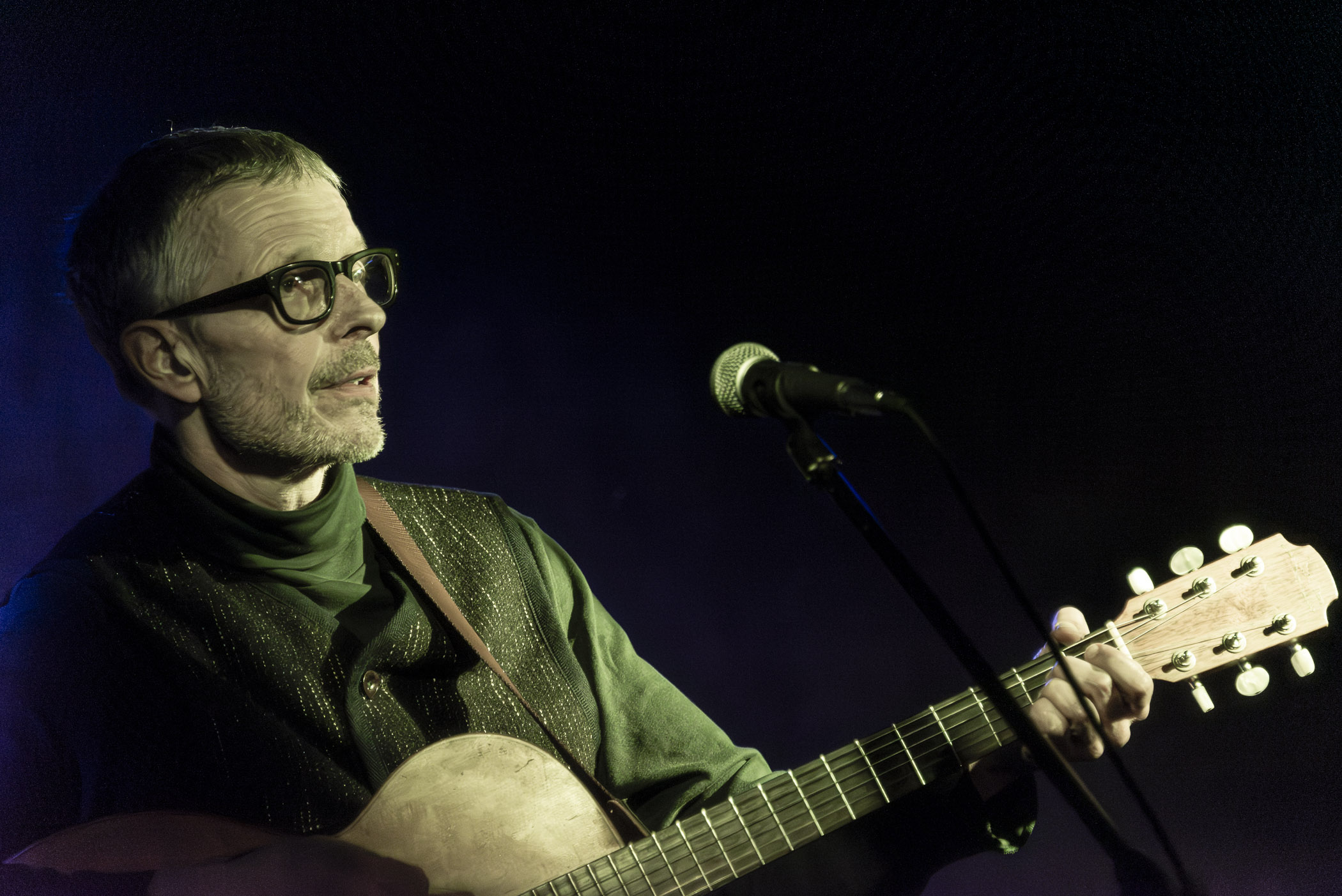
- Astor performing at the University of Westminster in 2024

Background information
- Born: 13 August 1960 (age 65); Hammersmith, London, England
- Genres: Indie rock, indie pop, electronic
- Occupations: Songwriter, lecturer, writer
- Years active: 1981–present
- Labels: Creation; Matador; Heavenly; Elevation; Fortuna Pop!; Tapete
- Website: http://peteastor.com

Peter Astor (born 13 August 1960) is an English songwriter and solo artist, known for his work with The Loft, The Weather Prophets, The Wisdom of Harry and Ellis Island Sound.

== History ==
Pete Astor was born in England, in 1960. The Loft formed in 1983, and signed to Creation Records to release two acclaimed singles, "Why Does the Rain" and "Up the Hill and Down the Slope". They split at the Hammersmith Palais in 1985. Astor then formed The Weather Prophets, continuing to be managed by Creation founder, Alan McGee, and signing to his short-lived Elevation label under the auspice of WEA4 releasing the album Mayflower in 1987. Returning to Creation for Judges, Juries and Horsemen, the band split in 1989.

Astor then undertook a solo career with the albums Submarine (1990) and Zoo (1991) on Creation. Finding success in France, Astor moved to the Danceteria label to release Paradise (1992, as Peter Astor and the Holy Road), and God and Other Stories in 1992.

After becoming disillusioned with the music business, he disappeared from view for a number of years, returning in the late 1990s with his Ellis Island Sound and The Wisdom of Harry projects, both releasing music on 7", 12" and 10" for a variety of emerging independent labels such as Static Caravan Recordings, Wurlitzer Jukebox and Astor's own label, Faux Lux. The Wisdom of Harry eventually signed to Matador Records, while Ellis Island Sound, Astor's collaboration with David Sheppard, signed with Heavenly Recordings.

In 2005, Astor released Hal's Eggs, a solo album including radical reworkings of folk standards on Static Caravan Recordings. At around the same time, Cherry Red released compilation albums featuring his work: The Loft's retrospective Magpie Eyes, The Weather Prophets' Blues Skies and Freerides (The Best Of, 1986–1989), and Injury Time (Solo 89–93). Astor continued to write and release with on the Peace Frog label. His solo album, Songbox followed in 2011, featuring an extra disc of cover versions of the albums' songs by Let's Wrestle, The Raincoats, Darren Hayman, Comet Gain, The Proper Ornaments, Mathew Sawyer, Dollboy and Piano Magic.

He works as senior lecturer at the University of Westminster, where he teaches, researches and writes about music; in 2014, he published his study of Richard Hell and the Voidoids' Blank Generation, as part of Bloomsbury's 33⅓ series. At the beginning of 2015, Astor signed to Fortuna Pop, and released the single "Mr Music", followed by an album, Spilt Milk, recorded with James Hoare of Veronica Falls. In 2020 he released "Attendant1: Music On/Opening Lines" under the name The Attendant, with "Music On" being an indie track which was recorded in a talk-sung style to evoke the work of Mark E. Smith.

== Solo discography ==
=== Albums ===
- Submarine (Creation, 1990)
- Zoo (Creation, 1991)
- Paradise (Danceteria, 1992, as Peter Astor and the Holy Road)
- God and Other Stories (Danceteria, 1993)
- Hal's Eggs (Static Caravan, 2005, as Pete Astor)
- Injury Time (Cherry Red, 2006)
- Songbox (Second Language, 2011, as Pete Astor)
- Spilt Milk (Slumberland Records, 2016, as Pete Astor)
- One for the Ghost (Tapete Records, 2018)
- You Made Me (2020)

=== Singles ===
- "Walk into the Wind" (Creation, 1990)
- "Chevron" (Creation, 1991)
- "Der Kaiser, Der Dealer und Das Geburtstagskind/Lundi Bleu" (Creation, 1991, split 7-inch with The Times)
- "Almost Falling in Love" (Danceteria, 1992, as Peter Astor and the Holy Road)
- "Disco Lights" (Danceteria, 1993)
- "Mr Music" (Fortuna Pop, 2015)
- "Water Tower" (Tapete, 2017)
- "English Weather" (Tapete, 2022)
- "Time on Earth" (Tapete, 2022)
