= Grace Carter (singer) =

English singer and songwriter

- Born: 26 May 1997 (age 29); London, England
- Occupations: Singer; songwriter
- Years active: 2017–present
- Relatives: Paul Phillips (step-father)
- Musical career
- Genres: R&B; soul; pop
- Instrument: Vocals
- Label: Polydor
- Website: gracecarterofficial.com

Grace Carter (born 26 May 1997) is an English singer and songwriter. She moved to Brighton at the age of eight, with her mother, but is now based in London. She released her debut single, "Silence", in May 2017. She rose to prominence after supporting Dua Lipa on tour during The Self-Titled Tour in October 2017, and has additionally been a supporting act for other performers including Rag'n'Bone Man. In 2018-19, she headlined two tours of the UK and Europe. Carter placed third in BBC Music's "Sound of 2019" poll of industry experts and artists. Her father was absent from her life, as he was raising another family; her stepfather is singer-songwriter and former Music Week journalist Paul Phillips, who she credits with the idea of venting her frustration by writing about it.

== Discography ==
=== Studio albums ===
List of studio albums, with selected details
Title	Details
When Saturn Returns	Released: 16 October 2026; Label: UnitedMasters; Format: Digital download

=== Extended plays ===
List of extended plays, with selected details
Title	Details
Why Her Not Me	Released: 10 December 2018; Label: Polydor; Format: Digital download
A Little Lost, A Little Found	Released: 21 July 2023; Label: BMG Rights Management; Format: Digital download

=== Singles ===
==== As lead artist ====
List of singles, showing year released and album/EP
Title	Year	Peak chart positions		Album/EP
Title	Year	IRE	SCO	Album/EP
"Silence"	2017	—	—	Why Her Not Me
"Ashes"	2017	—	—	Why Her Not Me
"Silhouette"	2018	—	—	Why Her Not Me
"Saving Grace"	2018	—	—	Why Her Not Me
"Why Her Not Me"	2018	—	—	Why Her Not Me
"Heal Me"	2019	—	—	Non-album singles
"Don't Hurt Like It Used To"	2019	—	—	Non-album singles
"Wicked Game"	2019	100	42	Non-album singles
"Fired Up"	2019	—	—	Non-album singles
"Amnesia"	2019	—	—	Non-album singles
"Blame" (with Jacob Banks)	2020	—	—	Non-album singles
"Dark Matter"	2021	—	—	Non-album singles
"Pick Your Tears Up"	2023	—	—	A Little Lost, A Little Found
"Bloodwar"	2023	—	—	A Little Lost, A Little Found
"Riot"	2023	—	—	A Little Lost, A Little Found
"You Got the Thing" (featuring Blanco)	2024	—	—	Non-album single
"White"	2026	—	—	When Saturn Returns
"Bittersweet Escape"	2026	—	—	When Saturn Returns
"Party Baby"	2026	—	—	When Saturn Returns
"Rather You Leave"	2026	—	—	When Saturn Returns

==== As featured artist ====
List of featured singles, showing year released and album name
Title	Year	Album
"Times Like These" (as part of Live Lounge Allstars)	2020	Non-album single
"Trustfall" (Blanco featuring Grace Carter)	2024	Gilberto's Son
