= The Weather Prophets =

British band

- Origin: London, England
- Genres: Indie pop
- Years active: 1986–1988
- Labels: Creation, Elevation
- Spinoff of: The Loft
- Past members: Peter Astor; Oisin Little; Greenwood Goulding; Dave Morgan

The Weather Prophets were a British indie band formed in London in 1986 after the break-up of The Loft. After two studio albums, the band split up, with singer Peter Astor going on to a solo career.

== History ==
Following the breakup of The Loft, Peter Astor (vocals, guitar) and Dave Morgan (drums) formed The Weather Prophets (named after a line in the opening paragraph of Henry Miller's Tropic of Cancer) in 1986. An early incarnation saw Creation Records head-honcho Alan McGee playing bass, but he soon reverted to manager as new members David Greenwood Goulding (bass) and Oisin Little (guitar) were recruited to complete the line up.
The debut single, "Almost Prayed" (Creation, 1986), seemed to carry on where The Loft had left off; consequently both interest and critical approval were high for the record, and a second single was issued on Creation that same year.

After a German mini-album, for the release of their debut album proper, McGee had successfully managed to sign the band to Elevation Records - the WEA subsidiary with which he was associated. Expectations were high when the Lenny Kaye-produced Mayflower appeared in 1987, but the album was greeted with a mixed response by the critics and the band were eventually dropped from the label. As McGee recalled:

"The Weather Prophets' album Mayflower came out in April 1987: a busy month for Warners. They were putting out new records by Prince, Fleetwood Mac and Simply Red, all at the height of their fame. You can’t blame Mayflower's failure purely on this but it definitely didn’t help. It only charted at 67. This would have been great on Creation but...it was no longer eligible for the indie charts and so there'd be no word of mouth that way."

All was not lost, however, as they eventually returned to Creation for a further album, Judges, Juries and Horsemen in 1988. By this time, Oisin Little had departed, and interest in the band had waned. A final single, "Always the Light", was issued before the band decided to split up.

== After the split ==
Following the split, Peter Astor embarked upon a solo career, and later recorded as Wisdom of Harry and Ellis Island Sound, while the two remaining members joined The Rockingbirds.

An odds 'n' ends compilation, Temperance Hotel, was released by Creation in 1989, with '87 Live appearing in 1991. Blue Skies & Freerides – The Best of 1986-1989 was issued by Cherry Red in 2004.

== Discography ==
=== Studio albums ===
- Diesel River (Creation/Rough Trade, 1986 - German Import)
- Mayflower (Elevation, 1987) (UK #67)
- Judges, Juries and Horsemen (Creation, 1988)

=== Compilation albums ===
- Temperance Hotel (Creation, 1989)
- Blue Skies & Freerides: The Best of 1986–1989 (Cherry Red, 2004)

=== Live albums ===
- '87 (Creation, 1991)

=== Singles ===
- "Almost Prayed" (Creation, 1986) UK No. 126
- "Naked as the Day You Were Born" (Creation, 1986) UK No. 141
- "She Comes from the Rain" (Elevation, 1987) (UK #62)
- "Why Does the Rain?" (Elevation, 1987) UK No. 109
- "Hollow Heart" (Creation, 1988) UK No. 167
- "Always the Light" (Creation, 1988) UK No. 144

== See also ==
- The Loft
- Peter Astor
