= The Loft (British band) =

English indie band

- Origin: London, England
- Genre: Indie
- Years active: 1980–1984; 2006–present
- Label: Creation
- Members: Peter Astor; Bill Prince; Andy Strickland; Dave Morgan

The Loft are an English indie band, whose debut single was one of the earliest releases on Creation Records.

== History ==
Formed in 1980 as The Living Room by Peter Astor (vocals, guitar), Bill Prince (bass), Andy Strickland (guitar) and Dave Morgan (drums), the band changed its name to The Loft when they discovered a local music venue also called The Living Room. The venue was being run by Alan McGee, with whom The Loft struck up a friendship and soon played several gigs for. After signing to McGee's fledgling Creation Records label, the band's debut single "Why Does the Rain?" was issued in 1984. "Up the Hill and Down the Slope" was issued the following year, earning both band and label some critical success.

A national tour as the opening act for The Colourfield was intended to give the band further exposure, but tensions within the band led to them splitting up whilst onstage of the Hammersmith Palais, on the final date of the tour.

== After the split ==
Almost immediately, Peter Astor and Dave Morgan formed a new band, The Weather Prophets, who were also signed to Creation. In 1989, Creation finally issued a compilation of their work entitled Once Around the Fair: The Loft 1982–1985, with Magpie Eyes 1982–1985 appearing on Rev-Ola in 2005. Guitarist Strickland became a music journalist and formed The Caretaker Race, and Prince formed The Wishing Stones.

In 2006, the band unexpectedly reformed, playing a handful of gigs and releasing a single of new material on Static Caravan Recordings.

The band continues to perform occasionally. In 2015, to celebrate 30 years since their "Up The Hill and Down the Slope" single topped the indie chart, the band played shows in New York in May (headlining the NY Popfest in Brooklyn) and in London in June, before recording their third BBC radio session—this time for fan and supporter Gideon Coe on BBC 6 Music.

The Loft is featured heavily on the Creation Artefact CD compilation released by Cherry Red Records in September 2015.

Forty years after originally splitting up, the band recorded their debut album, Everything Changes, Everything Stays the Same, in the summer of 2024, and released it on 14 March 2025 on Tapete Records. Containing all new material that Astor had written with The Loft in mind, the band undertook a promotional tour of UK venues and recorded a further session for BBC 6 Music.

== Discography ==
=== Singles ===
- "Why Does the Rain?" (Creation, 1984)
- "Up the Hill and Down the Slope" (Creation, 1985)
- "Model Village" (Static Caravan, 2006)
- "Riley & Coe Session 09.10.23" (Precious, 2024)
- "Dr. Clarke" (Precious, 2025)

=== Albums ===
- Everything Changes, Everything Stays the Same (Tapete, 2025)
- Badges (Tapete, 2026)

=== Compilation albums ===
- Once Around the Fair: The Loft 1982–1985 (Creation, 1989)
- Magpie Eyes 1982–1985 (Rev-Ola, 2005)
- Ghost Trains & Country Lanes (Studio, Stage & Sessions: 1984-2015) (Cherry Red, 2021)

== See also ==
- The Weather Prophets
