= Hemlata Talesra =

Indian educationalist

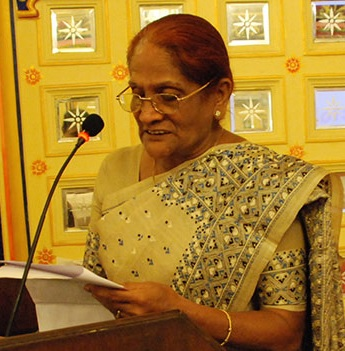
- Talesra in 2016
- Born: 1 July 1944 (age 82); Udaipur, Ajmir Province, British India (present-day Udaipur, Rajasthan, India)
- Education: Maharaja Sayajirao University of Baroda, Vadodara, Gujarat, India; Banasthali Vidyapith, Vanasthali, Rajasthan, India; Vidya Bhawan G.S. Teachers College, Udaipur, Rajasthan, India
- Spouse: Padam Singh Talesra
- Awards: Global Peace Leadership Award (2019); Life Time Achievement Award (2016); Vinoba Bhave Peace Award (2000)

Hemlata Talesra (born 1 July 1944) is an Indian educationalist. She is a writer and academic researcher holding administrative positions in multiple institutions.

She is a Commonwealth Council for Educational Administration and Management fellow, board member, Indian representative, chairman at Rajasthan Council of Educational Administration and Management, board member of World Constitution and Parliament Association, Director at Smt. K. B. Dave College of Education, Pilvai, Gujarat, former Reader in Education at Center of Advanced Studies in Education, Maharaja Sayajirao University of Baroda, Gujarat, former Director-Research, Professor & Head department of education, Jain Vishva Bharati Institute, Ladnun, Rajasthan, and former Professor Vidya Bhawan G.S. Teachers College, Udaipur, Rajasthan.

== Awards and honours ==
Year	Name of award or honour	Awarding organisation	Awarding authority
1993	John Dalvi Award	Leslie Sawhny Programme of Training for Democracy	B. G. Deshmukh's wife
2000	Vinoba Bhave Peace Award	-	-
2000	Gujarat Gaurav Award	-	-
2000	International Felicitation and Sardar Patel Education Development and Peace National Award	Commonwealth Association for the Education and Training of Adults (CAETA), International Association of Educators for World Peace (IAEWP), USA & The Global Open University, Milan	-
2001	International Felicitation and International Year of Women Empowerment 2001 Award	Commonwealth Association for the Education and Training of Adults (CAETA), International Association of Educators for World Peace (IAEWP), USA & The Global Open University, Milan	-
2004	International Felicitation	International Association of Educators for World Peace (IAEWP), USA, Commonwealth Association for the Education and Training of Adults (CAETA) & United Nations Information Centre Madhya Pradesh Council for Teacher Education	-
2016	Life Time Achievement Award	Commonwealth Council for Educational Administration and Management (CCEAM) (N), India	-
2019	Global Peace Leadership Award	World Constitution and Parliament Association (WCPA)	-

== Books ==
List of English language books:

- (1989) Higher education among women by Hemlata Talesra, National. ISBN 8121401771, ISBN 978-8121401777
- (1989) Tribal Education: A Quest for Integration in the Regional Mainstream by Hemlata Talesra, Himanshu Publications. ISBN 8185167249, ISBN 978-8185167244
- (1994) Social Background of Tribal Girl Students by Hemlata Talesra, Himanshu Publications. ISBN 8185167966, ISBN 978-8185167961
- (1997) Educational Management: Innovative Global Patterns by Hemlata Talesra, Satya Pal Ruhela, M. L. Nagda, Daya Books. ISBN 8186030506, ISBN 9788186030509
- (2001) Educational Leadership: Global Perspectives by Hemlata Talesra, Regency Publications. ISBN 8187498196, ISBN 9788187498193
- (2001) Agenda for Education: Design and Direction by Hemlata Talesra, Kanishka Publishers Distributors. ISBN 8173913838, ISBN 9788173913839
- (2002) Managing Educational Challenges: A Global View by Hemlata Talesra, P. K. Dashora, Shima Sarupria, Authorspress. ISBN 8172730926, ISBN 9788172730925
- (2002) Development of Citizenship Habits Among Indigenous People by Hemlata Talesra, Indian Publishers & Distributors. ISBN 8173412251, ISBN 9788173412257
- (2002) Human Rights Education: A Global Perspective by Hemlata Talesra, Nalini Pancholy, Mangi Lal Nagda, Regency Books ISBN 818749803X, ISBN 9788187498032
- (2003) Challenges of Education Technology, Trends, Globalisation by Hemlata Talesra, Maneesha Shukul, Uma Shanker Sharma, Authorspress. ISBN 8172731345, ISBN 9788172731342
- (2004) Scope and Trends of Research on Teaching by Hemlata Talesra, Authors Press. ISBN 8172731892, ISBN 978-8172731892
- (2004) Education for the Survival of Human Race by Nilima Bhagabati, Hemlata Talesra, Authorspress. ISBN 8172731639, ISBN 9788172731632
- (2006) Sociological Foundations of Education by Hemlata Talesra, Kanishka Publishers. ISBN 8173914516, ISBN 9788173914515
- (2006) Cultural Heritage and Educational Initiatives by Hemlata Talesra, Authorspress. ISBN 8172732821, ISBN 9788172732820
- (2008) Integrating Theory and Praxis in Education by Hemlata Talesra, M. L. Nagda, Authorspress. ISBN 8172734204, ISBN 9788172734206

List of Hindi language books:

- (2017) शिक्षा के समाजशास्त्रीय आधार (Sociological basis of education) by Hemlata Talesra, Rajasthan Hindi Granth Academy (RHGA). ISBN 9789351312635
- (2020) शैक्षिक प्रबंधन प्रशासन एवं नेतृत्व (Educational Management Administration & Leadership) by Hemlata Talesra, Rajasthan Hindi Granth Academy (RHGA). ISBN 9789389260380.
- (2020) विद्यालयीकरण, समाजीकरण एवं पहचान (Schooling, Socialization and Identity) by Hemlata Talesra, Rajasthan Hindi Granth Academy (RHGA). ISBN 9789389260625.

== See also ==
- Rajasthan Council of Educational Administration and Management
- Commonwealth Council for Educational Administration and Management
