= The Eighteenth Emergency EP =

EP by Butcher Boy
- Released: 3 September 2007
- Genre: Indie pop
- Label: HDIF Records

Professional ratings
Review scores
Source	Rating
Drowned in Sound	4/10
God Is in the TV	4/5 stars
Stylus	B+

The Eighteenth Emergency EP is an EP released by Butcher Boy on 3 September 2007 on HDIF Records.

The EP featured two new songs, "The Eighteenth Emergency" and "React or Die", and two reworked offerings from their debut LP Profit in Your Poetry: "There Is No-One Who Can Tell You Where You've Been" and "Keep Your Powder Dry".

"React or Die" is the title track of the band's second LP.

== Track listing ==
1. "There Is No-One Who Can Tell You Where You've Been"
2. "React or Die"
3. "Keep Your Powder Dry"
4. "The Eighteenth Emergency"
