= EERA =

EERA is a four letter abbreviation that can stand for a number of things:

- East of England Regional Assembly, the regional assembly for the East of England region of the United Kingdom.
- European Educational Research Association, an association of national educational research associations in Europe.
- European Energy Research Alliance, sponsored by the European Commission and formed in 2008
- Electrical Equipment Representatives Association
- European Electronics Recyclers Association, represents the interest of the WEEE recycling companies in Europe.
- Eastern Educational Research Association
- Rapla Airfield (ICAO airport code)
- EERA - the stage name of Norwegian singer/songwriter Anna Lena Bruland
