= Cautionary tale =

Tale told in folklore to warn its listener of a danger

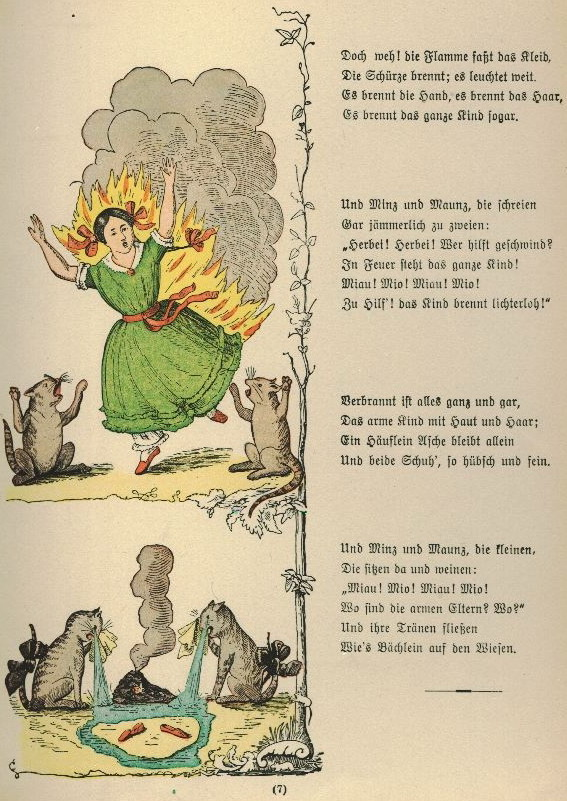
Illustration from "The Dreadful Story of Pauline and the Matches" from Struwwelpeter, by Heinrich Hoffman, 1858.

A cautionary tale or moral tale is a tale told in folklore to warn its listener of a danger. There are three essential parts to a cautionary tale, though they can be introduced in a large variety of ways. First, a taboo or prohibition is stated: some act, location, or thing is said to be dangerous. Then, the narrative itself is told: someone disregarded the warning and performed the forbidden act. Finally, the violator comes to an unpleasant fate, which is frequently related in expansive and grisly detail.

== Cautionary tales and conformity ==
Cautionary tales are ubiquitous in popular culture; many urban legends are framed as cautionary tales: from the lover's lane haunted by a hook-handed murderer to the tale of a man who shot a cactus for fun only to die when the plant toppled onto him. Like horror fiction, generally the cautionary tale exhibits an ambivalent attitude towards social taboos. The narrator of a cautionary tale is momentarily excused from the ordinary demands of etiquette that discourages the use of gruesome or disgusting imagery because the tale serves to reinforce some other social taboo.

Cautionary tales are also frequently utilized to spread awareness of moral issues. For this reason, they are often told to children to make them conform to rules that either protect them or are for their own safety.

Those whose job it is to enforce conformity therefore frequently resort to cautionary tales. The German language anthology, Struwwelpeter, contains tales such as "Die gar traurige Geschichte mit dem Feuerzeug" (The Dreadful Story of Pauline and the Matches); it is fairly easy to deduce the ending from the title. Social guidance films such as Boys Beware or Reefer Madness are deliberately patterned after traditional cautionary tales, as were the notorious driver's education films (Red Asphalt, Signal 30) of the 1960s, or military films about syphilis and other sexually transmitted diseases. The framework of the cautionary tale became a cliché in the slasher films of the 1980s, in which adolescents who had sex, drank alcoholic beverages, or smoked marijuana inevitably ended up as the victims of the serial killer villain.

On the other hand, in the adolescent culture of the United States, for more than a hundred years the traditional cautionary tale gave rise to the phenomenon of legend tripping, in which a cautionary tale is turned into the basis of a dare that invites the hearer to test the taboo by breaking it.

The cautionary tale has survived to the present day in another form, especially with the rise of modern mass media such as film and television; many public service announcements and public information films frame themselves as cautionary tales regarding both societal issues and common dangers in modern life, pushing conformity by warning viewers of the dangers and directing them towards avoiding the causes, or simply not doing actions that result in such dangers.

== Reactions to cautionary tales ==
The genre of the cautionary tale has been satirized by several writers. Hilaire Belloc in his Cautionary Tales for Children presented such moral examples as "Jim, Who ran away from his Nurse, and was eaten by a Lion", and "Matilda, Who told lies, and was Burned to Death". Lewis Carroll, in Alice's Adventures in Wonderland, says that Alice:

... had read several nice little histories about children who had got burnt, and eaten up by wild beasts and other unpleasant things, all because they would not remember the simple rules their friends had taught them: such as, that a red-hot poker will burn you if you hold it too long; and that if you cut your finger very deeply with a knife, it usually bleeds; and she had never forgotten that, if you drink much from a bottle marked "poison", it is almost certain to disagree with you, sooner or later.

In The Complete Tribune Printer, Eugene Field gave cautionary tales an ironic inversion, as in The Gun:

This is a gun. Is the Gun loaded? Really, I do not know. Let us Find out. Put the Gun on the table, and you, Susie, blow down one barrel while you, Charlie, blow down the other. Bang! Yes, it was loaded. Run quick, Jennie, and pick up Susie's head and Charlie's lower Jaw before the Nasty Blood gets over the New carpet.

Some films, such as Gremlins, satirized this framework by imposing very arbitrary rules whose violation results in horrendous consequences for the community by not taking responsibility.

Cautionary tales are sometimes heavily criticized for their ham-fisted approach to ethics. The Cold Equations is a well-known example. In the story, a man has to eject a young woman out of the airlock, otherwise the fuel of his rocket will not suffice to deliver some badly needed serum, without which everyone at a small outpost would perish. Her death is justified because she ignored a 'no entry' sign, "when the laws of physics say no, they don't mean maybe", and no other solution would reduce the weight of the ship enough to complete the trip safely.

== See also ==
- Morphology (folkloristics)
- Darwin Awards
- Cautionary Tales (podcast)

== Bibliography ==
- Clover, Carol J. (1992). Men, Women, and Chain Saws: Gender in the Modern Horror Film. Princeton University Press. ISBN 978-0-691-04802-4.
- Jones, Steven Swann (1987). "On Analyzing Fairy Tales: "Little Red Riding Hood" Revisited". Western Folklore. 46 (2): 97–106. doi:10.2307/1499927. JSTOR 1499927. INIST 11990781.
- Klein, Norman M. (1993). "Depression Melodrama". Seven Minutes: The Life and Death of the American Animated Cartoon. Verso. pp. 122–138. ISBN 978-1-85984-150-1.
- Schmidt, Gary D (2006). "Secrets beyond the Door: The Story of Bluebeard and His Wives (review)". The Lion and the Unicorn. 30 (1): 143–147. doi:10.1353/uni.2006.0011. S2CID 145304068. Project MUSE 192842.
- Smith, Ken (1999). Mental Hygiene: Classroom Films 1945–1970. Blast Books. ISBN 978-0-922233-21-2.
- White, Beatrice (June 1972). "A Persistent Paradox". Folklore. 83 (2): 122–131. doi:10.1080/0015587x.1972.9716461. JSTOR 1259445. PMID 11614481.
