= Girls Make Me Sick =

Single by Butcher Boy

from the album Profit In Your Poetry
- Released: 2007
- Recorded: 2006
- Length: 3:22
- Label: HDIF Records

"Girls Make Me Sick" is the debut single by Butcher Boy, released on HDIF Records in 2007. It received a rating of 9/10 when reviewed by Drowned In Sound, who described it as "a triumphantly bitter and sad slice of whimsy, custom-built for the fey kids down the disco in 1996 and just danceable enough to make it appropriate in this decade".

== Track listing ==
1. "Girls Make Me Sick"
2. "Permanent Past Tense"
3. "Arbor Day"
