= Carolyn M. Shields =

Educational leadership scholar

Carolyn Muriel Shields is an education scholar and professor emerita of educational leadership at Wayne State University in Detroit. Her research has focused on educational leadership, equity and social justice, and her writing on transformative leadership has contributed to its development as an approach distinct from transformational leadership. In 2017, she received the Roald F. Campbell Lifetime Achievement Award from the University Council for Educational Administration and an honorary doctorate from Université Laval.

== Education ==
Shields earned a BA in French and English in 1968 and an MA in French in 1970 at Queen's University. She taught in schools in Labrador, Ontario and Saskatchewan for nearly twenty years before moving into higher education, and received a PhD in educational administration from the University of Saskatchewan in 1991.

== Career ==
After an appointment as an assistant professor in Salt Lake City, Utah, from 1991 to 1994, Shields spent eleven years at the University of British Columbia, where she headed the Department of Educational Studies from 2000 to 2004 and was the founding director of the School Leadership Centre. She moved to the University of Illinois Urbana-Champaign in 2005 and to Wayne State University in 2011 as dean of the College of Education. During her deanship the college held an annual symposium on poverty and education, at which she spoke in 2014 on poverty as a question of social justice. She remained on the faculty after 2014 and is now professor emerita.

Shields was president of the Canadian Association for the Study of Educational Administration from 1998 to 2000. She represented Canada on the board of the Commonwealth Council for Educational Administration and Management from 2000 to 2004, was elected a fellow of the council in 2004, and was its president in 2022. She has also worked on education policy and programs in Canada, the United States, China and New Zealand.

== Research ==
Shields's research concerns equity, inclusion and social justice in schools, and the part school leaders play in changing conditions that disadvantage some students. Her 2003 book Good Intentions Are Not Enough: Transformative Leadership for Communities of Difference was reviewed in the Journal of Educational Administration, and Courageous Leadership for Transforming Schools (2009), reviewed in the McGill Journal of Education, argued that schools should function as democratic communities in which students practice citizenship.

In a 2010 article in Educational Administration Quarterly, "Transformative Leadership: Working for Equity in Diverse Contexts", Shields set out transformative leadership as a theory separate from transformational leadership. In a review of the literature, Tarryn De Kock and Sharlene Swartz describe the article as delineating transformative leadership "as a standalone theory of leadership", and note that the two terms are "regularly, but erroneously, conflated"; they contrast it with transformational leadership, which in their account lacks "a moral imperative for organisations to contribute to social change". The article describes the approach as joining "critique and promise" and calling for "moral courage and activism"; De Kock and Swartz also note that critics have found the theory "too idealistic and too demanding".

Shields developed the theory at book length in Transformative Leadership in Education (2013; third edition 2024) and Becoming a Transformative Leader (2020), and edited Transformative Leadership: A Reader (2011). The framework has also been used outside North America. Transformative Leadership in African Contexts (2024), produced through a research partnership between the Human Sciences Research Council and the Mastercard Foundation, draws on the work of Paulo Freire and on Shields's 2010 article. Shields had written on the subject for a 2016 University World News series produced in partnership with the same foundation.

Related work examines how schools respond to difference and disadvantage. In a 2004 article she argued that school leaders can foster the academic success of all children through moral dialogue that challenges the silencing and deficit labeling of marginalized students and families. She pursued these ideas in Dialogue Is Not Just Talk (2005), written with Mark M. Edwards, in a Bakhtin Primer (2007) on the work of Mikhail Bakhtin, and in Pathologizing Practices: The Impact of Deficit Thinking on Education (2005), written with Russell Bishop and André Elias Mazawi. With Ira Bogotch she edited two Springer handbooks on educational leadership and social (in)justice, published in 2014 and 2026, and with Andréanne Gélinas-Proulx a collection on equity in Canadian schools, Leading for Equity and Social Justice (2022). A 2014 article applied transformative leadership to child poverty.

Her earlier research examined year-round school calendars. Year-Round Schooling: Promises and Pitfalls (2000), written with Steven L. Oberg, received the Liebman Book Award. Shields has argued that such calendars matter for equity, because children from less advantaged families lose three to four months of learning over the summer, widening the "gap between richer and poorer children".

== Professional service and leadership ==
Shields was president of the Canadian Association for the Study of Educational Administration from 1998 to 2000. She represented Canada on the board of the Commonwealth Council for Educational Administration and Management and was elected a fellow of the council in 2004. She later served as the council's president and became its past-president. From 2005 she was a member of the board of the University Council for Educational Administration, and she has served on the editorial boards of five international journals. She has also worked on education policy and programs in Canada, the United States, China and New Zealand, and with school leaders in the United Arab Emirates.

== Recognition ==
In 2017 the University Council for Educational Administration gave Shields its Roald F. Campbell Lifetime Achievement Award, which since 1992 has recognized senior professors of educational administration whose careers include major contributions to the field's knowledge base. The same year Université Laval awarded her an honorary doctorate in educational administration and policy. Earlier honours include the Distinguished Service Award of the Canadian Association for the Study of Educational Administration (2009) and the Teaching for Social Justice Award of the American Educational Research Association's Leadership for Social Justice special interest group (2010).

== Selected works ==
- Shields, C. M.; Oberg, S. L. (2000). Year-Round Schooling: Promises and Pitfalls. Lanham, MD: Scarecrow Press. ISBN 978-0-8108-3744-7.
- Shields, C. M. (2003). Good Intentions Are Not Enough: Transformative Leadership for Communities of Difference. Lanham, MD: Scarecrow Press. ISBN 978-0-8108-4514-5.
- Shields, C. M. (2004). "Dialogic Leadership for Social Justice: Overcoming Pathologies of Silence". Educational Administration Quarterly 40 (1): 109–132. doi:10.1177/0013161X03258963.
- Shields, C. M. (2010). "Transformative Leadership: Working for Equity in Diverse Contexts". Educational Administration Quarterly 46 (4): 558–589. doi:10.1177/0013161X10375609.
- Shields, C. M. (2013). Transformative Leadership in Education. New York: Routledge. 3rd ed. 2024. doi:10.4324/9781003464006.
- Bogotch, I.; Shields, C. M., eds. (2014). International Handbook of Educational Leadership and Social (In)Justice. Dordrecht: Springer. doi:10.1007/978-94-007-6555-9.
- Shields, C. M. (2020). Becoming a Transformative Leader: A Guide to Creating Equitable Schools. New York: Routledge. doi:10.4324/9780429261091.
