= Public service broadcasting (disambiguation) =

Public Service Broadcasting may refer to

- Public broadcasting; radio, television, and other electronic media whose primary mission is public service
- Public Service Broadcasting, a British band

== See also ==
- Public Broadcasting Service (PBS), an American public broadcaster
