= Mustafa Yunus Eryaman =

Turkish academic (born 1977)

- Born: 1977 (age 48–49)

Academic background
- Education: University of Missouri; University of Illinois at Urbana–Champaign

Mustafa Yunus Eryaman (born 1977) is a professor of education at Çanakkale Onsekiz Mart University. He is specialized on educational policy, philosophy of education, curriculum theory and research, critical pedagogy, and progressive education.

Eryaman is currently the president of the International Association of Educators and the vice president of the World Education Research Association. He has served as associate dean in the Faculty of Education and as Interim Chancellor (General Secretary) at Çanakkale Onsekiz Mart University. He is a DAAD-TUBITAK professor at the Institute for International Comparative and Intercultural Education (University of Hamburg) since 2014. He serves as a council member in the European Educational Research Association and president of the Turkish Educational Research Association.

== Career ==
Eryaman received his M.Ed. from the University of Missouri and his Ph.D. from the University of Illinois at Urbana–Champaign. He has worked at the University of Illinois at Urbana–Champaign, the University of Hamburg, Near East University, and London Metropolitan University, and is currently at Çanakkale Onsekiz Mart University. Eryaman has also served as a Doctoral Supervisor in Summer Doctoral Schools of the European Educational Research Association at the University of Gothenburg.

== Editorial responsibilities ==
Eryaman serves as the series editor of a Springer Science+Business Media book series entitled "Evidence, Science and Public Good in Education" and as the regional editor of the "Bloomsbury Education and Childhood Studies" series ( Bloomsbury Publishing). In addition, Eryaman serves as managing or associate editor of the following academic journals:

- International Journal of Progressive Education
- Educational Policy Analysis and Strategic Research
- International Journal of Educational Researchers
