= ECER =

ECER may refer to:

- East Coast Economic Region, an economic region in Malaysia
- European Conference on Educational Research, an annual event held by the European Educational Research Association
- European Congress of Ethnic Religions, a neopagan organization
