= The War Room (EP) =

EP by Public Service Broadcasting
- Released: 28 May 2012
- Genre: Art rock, indie rock, electronica
- Length: 17:41
- Label: Test Card Recordings
- Producer: J. Willgoose, Esq

Public Service Broadcasting chronology
One (2010)	The War Room (2012)	Inform-Educate-Entertain (2013)

Professional ratings
Review scores
Source	Rating
The Independent	4/5 stars

The War Room, is a five-track EP from Public Service Broadcasting.

The EP is dedicated to J. Willgoose, Esq's great-uncle George Willgoose who died at Dunkirk.

== Track listing ==
No.	Title	Length
1.	"If War Should Come"	4:38
2.	"London Can Take It"	3:28
3.	"Spitfire"	3:56
4.	"Dig for Victory"	3:17
5.	"Waltz for George"	2:24
Total length:		16:43

== Personnel ==
- J. Willgoose, Esq. - Banjo, Electronics, Guitar, Sampling
- Stephen Hackshaw - Strings
- Wrigglesworth - Drums, Electronics, Piano
- Barry Gardner - Mastering
- Charlie Thomas - Drum Engineering

== Samples ==
The first four tracks on the EP featured each use samples from a different British World War II propaganda film; If War Should Come (1939), London Can Take It! (1940), The First of the Few (1942) and Dig for Victory (1941).

== Cover artwork ==
The front cover of the EP used a photograph of the bomb-damaged library in Holland House in Kensington, London. A copy is held by the Historic England Archive who record that it was taken on 23 October 1940 and attribute it to Mr. Harrison of Fox Photos.
