= Signal 30 =

1959 social guidance film

Signal 30 is a 1959 social guidance film made by the Highway Safety Foundation in the vicinity of Mansfield, Ohio. The film, shown widely to high school students across the United States during the 1960s through the 1980s, was produced by Richard Wayman and narrated by Wayne Byers, and takes its name from the radio code used by the Ohio State Highway Patrol for a fatal traffic accident.

Signal 30 features graphic footage of crashed automobiles and their horrifically injured and dismembered occupants. Despite its gruesome nature, the film later won the National Safety Council Award. It was followed by two sequels, entitled Mechanized Death and Wheels of Tragedy, and inspired a genre of similarly gory road safety films.

== In popular culture ==
- The film was featured in, and lent its name to, an episode of Mad Men.
- An instrumental by The Who, "Sodding About" (an outtake from The Who Sell Out) has commonly been referred to as "Signal 30", in part due to bassist John Entwistle's morbid curiosity.
- Signal 30 was the basis for a song of the same name by British band Public Service Broadcasting for their 2013 album Inform-Educate-Entertain.

== See also ==
- List of American films of 1959
- Red Asphalt
