= The Gresham Flyers =

- Origin: London, England
- Genres: Power pop, indie pop
- Years active: 2004-2011
- Labels: Cherryade Records (UK); Universal Records (Philippines); Barryland Records (UK); Cloudberry Records (U.S.); Plus appearances on Fortuna Pop! Records (UK); Where It's At is Where You Are Records (UK); How Does It Feel To Be Loved? Records (UK)
- Past members: James Agnew (2007-); Thom Allott (2004-); Martin Hall (2004-); Sharon Leach (2004-); John Waring (2004-); Kerry Edmonds (2006); Dan Morton (2004-2006); Andrew Newman (2004-2007); Jessica Shaw (2004-2005)
- Website: www.thegreshamflyers.com www.myspace.com/thegreshamflyers

The Gresham Flyers were a power pop band, formed in 2005 and based in London, England, although none of their members or former members are originally from London.

== Biography ==
The initial members of the band were seven friends who first met via the indie-centric Bowlie internet message board, and came together as a band after a request by Martin Hall for bandmates into Mogwai, The Libertines, Snow Patrol and Yeah Yeah Yeahs. Although none of the potential members were fans of those bands, common ground was found in the likes of Belle & Sebastian, The Wedding Present, Pulp, New Order, Dexys Midnight Runners and XTC. These influences were absorbed into the band's sound, and exemplified by the use of two lead vocalists in John Waring and Sharon Leach, as well as the unusual inclusion of two keyboards along with two guitars and a rhythm section and (initially) saxophone.

After a brief period of rehearsal as a septet, Jessica Shaw left the band (later to resurface in as drummer/ bass player in Give It Ups), and the remaining six members played their debut set at The Pleasure Unit in July 2005. With all members of the band able to play more than one instrument, early gigs were marked by onstage instrument-swapping between songs, and Andrew Newman's home-made synthesiser sound, best heard on early recordings Cat Hits Car and Blackpool.

Their debut 7" single "Shiftwork" b/w Cat Hits Car was released on their own Barryland Records in 2006, attracting critical acclaim. The single was ignored by mainstream radio due to the opening word of the song being profanity, but gained many plays on internet and student radio, most notably on Rachael Neiman's show on Dandelion Radio.

Around this time, they also released the song "Blackpool" on The Kids at the Club, a popular compilation of up-and-coming bands put together for How Does It Feel To Be Loved Records.

Dan Morton left the band in early 2006 (although he continued to make occasional appearances as an additional percussionist at gigs), and was replaced by Kerry Edmonds, a gifted drummer also proficient in keyboards and guitar. With this lineup, the band recorded the bulk of their debut album at Soup Studios in London, under the auspices of Simon Trought (ex-Tompaulin). The band also undertook tours, supporting the likes of Cannonball Jane, The Loves, Saturday Looks Good To Me, Great Lakes and Ladybug Transistor. Kerry Edmonds eventually left the group at the end of 2006, followed shortly after by Andrew Newman in May 2007.

The band recruited former drummer for The Scaramanga Six James Agnew as a replacement from Kerry Edmonds, but decided not to replace Andrew Newman and to continue as a quintet in an effort to streamline their live sound (but restricting their between-song instrument-swapping forays in the process). This lineup of the band endured for the remainder of the band's lifetime, with Agnew adding more multi-instrumental capabilities, further songwriting contributions and a third lead vocal.

Following on from performing at the inaugural Indietracks Festival in 2007, Cherryade Records agreed release the band's debut album Sex With Strangers in 2008 as well as offering an appearance on the label's annual A Very Cherry Christmas compilation, which featured "Diamond White Christmas". By the time the album was released in July 2008, most of the recordings were nearly two years old, from a previous lineup, and the band had begun recording new tracks in their current guise.

There was little activity during 2008 due to outside commitments, but still saw the release of split 10" single with Wintergreen and a further appearance on the Very Cherry Christmas release, this time Perfect Christmas Snow (Perfect Christmas Kiss) (featuring lead vocals from John, Sharon and James), for which the band received their highest critical notices yet.

A further split single followed in February 2009, this time on Cloudberry Records, with The Pale Corners. The track Berry Buck Mills Stipe was premiered in a live video on YouTube in early 2008, which led to the band's signing to Universal Records in the Philippines. 2009 also saw James and Sharon (along with Spearmint guitarist James Parsons and Scritti Politti's Rhodri Marsden) release the album Now I'm The Big Sister as tELLEY. For live appearances, the band also featured Thom on bass.

Following on from an acclaimed appearance on a recent Bruce Springsteen tribute album, the band confirmed a further appearance on an upcoming Jonathan Richman tribute album released by Fortuna Pop! Records, covering "Pablo Picasso".

During February 2010, the band created an entirely new album as part of the 2010 RPM Challenge, with plans to release it as a download-only effort, whilst continuing work on the follow-up to Sex With Strangers.

The first full release on Cherryade Records since Sex With Strangers, an EP entitled There's Been a Murder was released on 6 April 2010. Lead track "Taggart" was premiered on Tom Robinson's BBC 6 Music Introducing show in January 2010.

Following a final album, and a support slot with long-term influence The Features, the band split in 2011. Thom Allott, Sharon Leach and Dan Morton all later joined indie band A Fine Day for Sailing, while James Agnew (now on guitar and lead vocals), John Waring and Thom Allott (later replaced by Martin Hall) reconvened as The Horses of Instruction (also featuring Jake Chivers, former drummer for A Fine Day for Sailing).

== Members ==
- John Waring - Vocals / Guitars (+ Bass Guitar / Keyboards / Drums)
- Sharon Leach - Vocals / Keyboards (+ Bass Guitar)
- Thom Allott - Bass Guitar / Backing Vocals (+ Guitar / Keyboards / Drums / Percussion)
- Martin Hall - Guitar (+ Bass Guitar)
- Jessica Shaw - Saxophone / Keyboards (+ Bass Guitar / Backing Vocals) Original member, left early 2005, not replaced
- Andrew Newman - Synthesiser / Drums / Bass Guitar (+ Guitar / Percussion) Original member, left mid 2007, not replaced
- Dan Morton - Drums / Synthesiser / Bass Guitar (+ Guitar) Original member, left early 2006, replaced by Kerry Edmonds
- Kerry Edmonds - Drums / Synthesiser (+ Bass Guitar) Replaced Dan Morton, left early 2007, replaced by James Agnew
- James Agnew - Drums (+ Vocals / Keyboards / Bass Guitar / Guitar / Percussion)

== Discography ==
=== Singles ===
- "Shiftwork b/w Cat Hits Car" (Barryland Records, Blue 7" Vinyl, 2006)
- "Factory Records Museum b/w Are 'Friends' Electric?" (Split single w/ Wintergreen, Barryland Records, 10" Vinyl, 2008)
- "Berry Buck Mills Stipe b/w Blackwall Tunnel" (Split single w/ The Pale Corners Cloudberry Records, 3" CD, 2009)

=== Extended plays ===
- "Tour EP" (Barryland Records, CD, 2005)
- "There's Been A Murder EP" (Cherryade Records, CD, 2010)

=== Albums ===
- Sex With Strangers (Cherryade Records, CD, 2008)
- River Pollution Music (Barryland Records, CD, Download, 2010)
- ...It Doesn't Have To Be About Endings (Barryland Records, Download, 2011)

=== Compilation albums ===
- The Kids At The Club (How Does It Feel To Be Loved Records, July 2006, contains Blackpool)
- A Very Cherry Christmas, Vol. 3 (Cherryade Records, November 2007, contains Diamond White Christmas)
- A Very Cherry Christmas (Cherryade Records, November 2008, contains Perfect Christmas Snow (Perfect Christmas Kiss)
- Play Some Pool, Skip Some School, Act Real Cool: A Global Tribute To Bruce Springsteen (Where It's At Is Where You Are Records, July 2009, contains Magic)
- A Very Cherry Christmas, Vol. 5 (Cherryade Records, November 2009, contains Mistletoe Misadventure)
- A Very Cherry Christmas, Vol. 6 (Cherryade Records, November 2010, contains A Christmas Star For Xanthe-Rose)
