= Every Valley =

Studio album by Public Service Broadcasting
- Released: 7 July 2017
- Recorded: January–February 2017
- Studios: Leeders Vale Studios and Ebbw Vale Institute (Ebbw Vale, Wales)
- Genre: Art rock
- Length: 44:58
- Label: PIAS Recordings
- Producers: J. Willgoose, Esq.

Public Service Broadcasting chronology
The Race for Space (2015)	Every Valley (2017)	Bright Magic (2021)

Every Valley is a studio album by British art rock band Public Service Broadcasting. The group's third original album, it is a concept album which focuses on a topic of modern history, much like the band's previous work. The album's story depicts the history of the mining industry in Wales, more specifically chronicling the rise and decline of the country's coal industry. The band's lead songwriter, J Willgoose, Esq., described the album's premise as an allegory for today's "abandoned and neglected communities across the western world", which have led to a "malignant, cynical and calculating brand of politics."

Every Valley was recorded in situ in the former steelworks town of Ebbw Vale, in South Wales. The band made use of a community hall formerly used as a convention space by the town's local workers' institute for the album's recording. It also features guest appearances by Welsh musicians James Dean Bradfield and Lisa Jên Brown, Scottish singer Tracyanne Campbell (of Camera Obscura) and English band Haiku Salut, as well as the Beaufort Male Choir. The album was released by PIAS Recordings on 7 July 2017. The album was commercially successful in the band’s home country, with critical reception being highly positive.

== Composition and themes ==
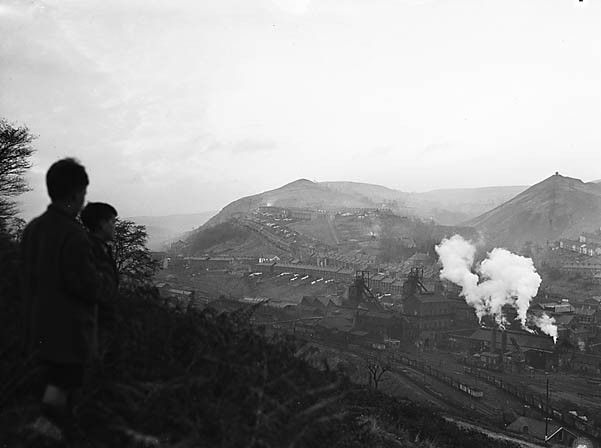
A 1951 view of Elliots Colliery, located in Rhymney Valley, one of many 20th century coal mines in the South Wales Coalfield.

Every Valley has been described as "a story of industrial decline", by the band's lead writer J. Willgoose Esq. in a post on social media blog site Tumblr. The album begins in the "golden age" of the mining industry in Wales, and documents the industry's progress, decline, and its aftermath, with the nationwide miners' strike playing a crucial role in the album's story. While Willgoose and his family has no involvement in Wales' mining industry, he cited "the romanticism of the valleys and their geography", and his interest in the country's history with mining, as inspirations for the creation of Every Valley. Contemporary political themes were also a driver for the album's development, with Willgoose stating that the decline of the Welsh mining industry was "a story reflected in abandoned and neglected communities across the western world, and one which has led to the resurgence of a particularly malignant, cynical and calculating brand of politics."

"Progress", the fourth track on Every Valley, was inspired by the sound of Kraftwerk, with its bass line and use of a vocoder drawing parallels to the tropes of the German electronic group. The song, which appeared on a single prior to the release of the album, was intended by Willgoose as a message that "progress will win in the end", using samples of 1950s documentaries on the progress of technology in the mining industry, and a chorus stating "I believe in progress". Willgoose also affirmed that the song continued the band's motto of "celebrating human achievements, innovation and resilience, even in the face of overwhelming odds", combating his fear that people thought of his band as purely nostalgia-based. He also affirmed that "Progress" is "an attempt to state that more explicitly, especially at a time when certain regressive elements seem determined to take us back to some non-existent, halcyon 1950s era."

== Recording ==
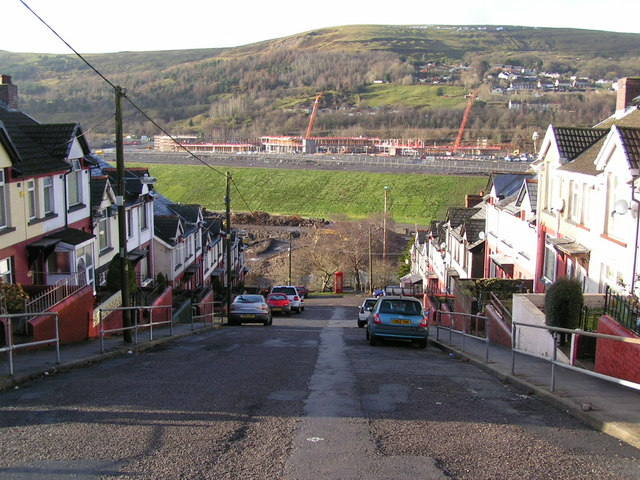
View of the defunct steelworks factory near Ebbw Vale, where the band recorded Every Valley.

The band traveled to Ebbw Vale, Wales, a former steelworks town to record Every Valley in the lecture hall of a defunct workers' institute. J. Willgoose Esq. wrote of the idea to record in Ebbw Vale, "it seemed important to record in the valleys, as I wanted this album to feel connected to the area it was written about in ways our previous albums hadn’t been. I wanted the album to have a rich, earthy, full sound, and to carry some of the lilt and lyricism of the language itself." To assist and inform the record's production, the band conducted interviews with local townspeople in Ebbw Vale about their histories with the mining industry in the region, of which some were recorded and appear on the album itself.

Four featured artists appear on Every Valley, including two of Willgoose's musical heroes – James Dean Bradfield, the frontman of Welsh alternative rock band Manic Street Preachers, and Tracyanne Campbell, the lead singer and guitarist for Scottish indie pop band Camera Obscura. They appear on "Turn No More" and "Progress" respectively. The album also features Welsh actress and singer Lisa Jen Brown, of Welsh language folk band 9 Bach, on "You + Me", and the English post rock band Haiku Salut on "They Gave Me a Lamp". Every Valley is the first Public Service Broadcasting record to contain vocals by its frontman, J. Willgoose Esq..

== Promotion ==
The announcement of the album's release was shortly preceded by the release of "Progress", one of the album's tracks, on a single of the same name on 9 March 2017. Every Valley was officially unveiled by the band on 20 March, through an announcement video uploaded onto the band's social media pages that detailed the album's title and a release date of 7 July 2017. Two weeks later, on 3 April, the album was put up for pre-order on their website and through various retailers. The album's full track list and featured artists were also revealed on the day. The album will be released on compact disc, digital download and LP vinyl formats, along with a limited edition clear vinyl format.

A music video for "Progress" was also released on 3 April. The video, which pays a homage to the signature surrealism of the music videos of Kraftwerk, features the band surveying the musical progress of cloned versions of themselves, with scientists in white coat also observing and recording notes. Willgoose stated about the video, "the song itself nods quite heavily to Kraftwerk, we also thought it'd be nice to make the video a similarly respectful doff of the cap in their direction." Prior to the release of the album, two shows by the band, billed as "Every Valley Live", were played at the Ebbw Vale Institute on 8 and 9 June, staged to preview and promote the album's release. The concerts themselves were preceded by a previously-announced show at the Electric Ballroom, in London, England, on 31 May.

== Accolades ==
Publication	Accolade	Year	Rank	Ref.
Drowned in Sound	Favourite Albums of 2017	2017	97	

== Track listing ==
All tracks are written by J. Willgoose, Esq., except where noted

Every Valley
No.	Title	Writer(s)	Length
1.	"Every Valley"		4:42
2.	"The Pit"		4:24
3.	"People Will Always Need Coal"		4:46
4.	"Progress" (featuring Tracyanne Campbell)		3:25
5.	"Go to the Road"		4:16
6.	"All Out"		3:22
7.	"Turn No More" (featuring James Dean Bradfield)	Bradfield; Idris Davies; Willgoose	4:35
8.	"They Gave Me a Lamp" (featuring Haiku Salut)	Gemma Barkerwood; Sophie Barkerwood; Louise Croft; JFAbraham; Willgoose	3:56
9.	"You + Me" (featuring Lisa Jên Brown)	Brown; Willgoose	5:44
10.	"Mother of the Village"		3:37
11.	"Take Me Home" (Edwards Hand cover)	Rod Edwards; Roger Hand	2:11
Total length:			44:58

== Personnel ==
Credits adapted from Every Valley liner notes.

Public Service Broadcasting

- J Willgoose, Esq. – guitars (tracks 1–10), synths (tracks 1–7), percussion (tracks 2–4, 8), wurlitzer (tracks 2, 3), vocals (track 9), producer, mixer
- Wrigglesworth – drums (tracks 1–10), percussion (tracks 2, 3, 7), glockenspiel (tracks 8, 10), vibraphone (track 1), monster clap (track 1), "carpenter-in-chief" [sic]
- JF Abraham – bass guitar (tracks 4, 5, 7–10), trumpet (tracks 1, 8), percussion (tracks 2, 3), brass arrangement (tracks 1, 2, 6, 8, 9), string arrangement (tracks 1–3, 6, 9), "vibes-man-in-chief" [sic]

Technical personnel

- Paul Blakeman – recording setup
- Jack Bonney – studio setup
- James Campbell – engineer
- Jon Constantine – assistant engineer
- Matt Davies – drum tech
- Giles Floodgate – studio setup

Artwork

- Phil Armson – art direction and design
- Hannah Benkwitz – album cover
- Andrew MacColl – band photography
- Gerard Saint – art direction and design

Wind musicians

- Edward Hallinan – tuba (track 1)
- Kevin O'Hara – French horn (track 1)
- Oliver Hickie – French horn (track 1, 9)
- Craig MacDonald – French horn (track 1)
- Iain Maxwell – tenor trombone (track 1, 8, 9), bass trombone (track 2)
- Barnaby Philpott – bass trombone (track 1, 2, 9), tenor trombone (track 8)
- James Pillai – French horn (track 1, 9)
- Rittipo – bass clarinet (track 2), tenor saxophone (track 4), baritone saxophone (track 4), alto saxophone (track 8)
- Toby Street – trumpet (track 1, 8, 9)

String musicians

- Abigail Blackman – cello (track 1–3, 6, 9)
- Emma Bryden – cello (track 1–3, 6, 9), string ensemble manager
- Holly Cook – double bass (track 1, 3)
- Katy Cox – cello (track 1, 2, 9)
- Katey Day – double bass (track 1, 3)
- Simon Howes – violin (track 1, 2, 9)
- Dan Jones – violin (track 1, 9)
- Bernard Kane – viola (track 1, 2, 9)
- Sue Lord – violin (track 1, 9)
- Sarah Loveridge – violin (track 1, 9)
- Naomi Rump – violin (track 1, 2, 9)
- January Tewson – viola (track 1, 2, 9)
- Ian Vorley – viola (track 1, 2, 9)

Additional musicians

- Beaufort Male Choir – choir vocals (track 11)
- James Dean Bradfield – vocals (track 7)
- Lisa Jên Brown – vocals (track 9)
- Tracyanne Campbell – vocals, vocoder (track 4)
- Haiku Salut – vocals (track 8), accordion (track 8), percussion (track 8)

== Charts ==
Chart (2017)	Peak position
Irish Albums (IRMA)	83
New Zealand Heatseekers Albums (RMNZ)	2
Scottish Albums (Official Charts)	3
UK Albums (Official Charts)	4

== Release history ==
Country	Date	Label	Format	Catalog no.
United Kingdom	7 July 2017	PIAS Recordings	CD · digital · vinyl	PIASR970CDX (CD); PIASR970LP (LP); PIASR970LPX (Clear LP)
