= Inform-Educate-Entertain =

Inform - Educate - Entertain

Studio album by Public Service Broadcasting
- Released: 6 May 2013
- Genre: Alternative rock; indie rock; art rock; krautrock; dance-punk; electronica
- Label: Test Card Recordings

Public Service Broadcasting chronology
The War Room (2012)	Inform - Educate - Entertain (2013)	The Race for Space (2015)

Singles from Inform-Educate-Entertain
- 1. "Spitfire"; 2. "Everest"; 3. "Signal 30"; 4. "Theme from PSB"; 5. "Night Mail"

Inform - Educate - Entertain is the first album by alternative British group Public Service Broadcasting. It features samples from the British Film Institute (BFI) and The National Archives (UK) and features themes from the first expedition of Mount Everest, the invention of colour television, road safety, fashion, the creation of the Spitfire plane and Thomas Woodrooffe's 1937 radio broadcast at the Spithead Review. It peaked at No. 21 on the UK Albums Chart.

The album title is a reference to the original directive of the British Broadcasting Corporation.

== Track listing ==
All tracks are written by J. Willgoose, Esq.

No.	Title	Subject of samples	Length
1.	"Inform - Educate - Entertain"	Snippets from other tracks on the album	4:12
2.	"Spitfire"	The 1942 film The First of the Few (about the Supermarine Spitfire aircraft)	3:58
3.	"Theme from PSB"	Marie Slocombe speaking about the BBC Sound Archive in 1942	3:59
4.	"Signal 30"	The 1959 road safety film Signal 30	3:20
5.	"Night Mail"	The 1936 documentary Night Mail	3:50
6.	"Qomolangma"	None (instrumental)	1:51
7.	"ROYGBIV"	The invention of colour television	3:57
8.	"The Now Generation"	Fashion	3:42
9.	"Lit Up"	Thomas Woodrooffe's drunken radio broadcast from HMS Nelson at the 1937 Spithead Review	4:54
10.	"Everest"	The 1953 British Mount Everest expedition	3:47
11.	"Late Night Final"	The 1948 short film What a Life!, and a sample from the Talking Heads episode A Lady of Letters	5:52
Total length:			43:22

== Personnel ==
Musicians

- J. Willgoose, Esq. – guitars, bass, banjo, banjolele, mandola, sampling, keys, electronics, percussion badly, arrangements
- Wrigglesworth – drums, alto saxophone (track 11), cargo crowd shot photography
- Stephen Hackshaw – skilfully-constructed samples (tracks 3, 11)
- Robert Greenwood – flugelhorn, trumpet (tracks 6, 10)
- Ed Mills – French horn (tracks 6, 10)
- Owen Wales – trombone (tracks 6, 10)
- Andy Fell – tenor saxophone (track 11)

Production

- Gregor Reid – drums recording at Fonica Studios, Glasgow (tracks 1, 3, 4, 5, 7, 9, 11)
- Charlie Thomas – drums recording at Britannia Row Studios, London (track 2)
- Davide Venco – drums And brass recording At Britannia Row Studios, London (tracks 6, 10)
- Kate Kape – voiceover recording (track 11)
- Jamie Roberts – artwork
- Gerard Saint, Phil Armson – packaging and design
- Barry Gardner – mastering
- Mr Alex Toumazis – additional photography

== Charts ==
Chart (2013)	Peak position
UK Albums (OCC)	21

=== Certifications ===
Region	Certification	Certified units/sales
United Kingdom (BPI)	Silver	60,000^{‡}
^{‡} Sales+streaming figures based on certification alone.
