= Haiku Salut =

English instrumental trio (2010– )

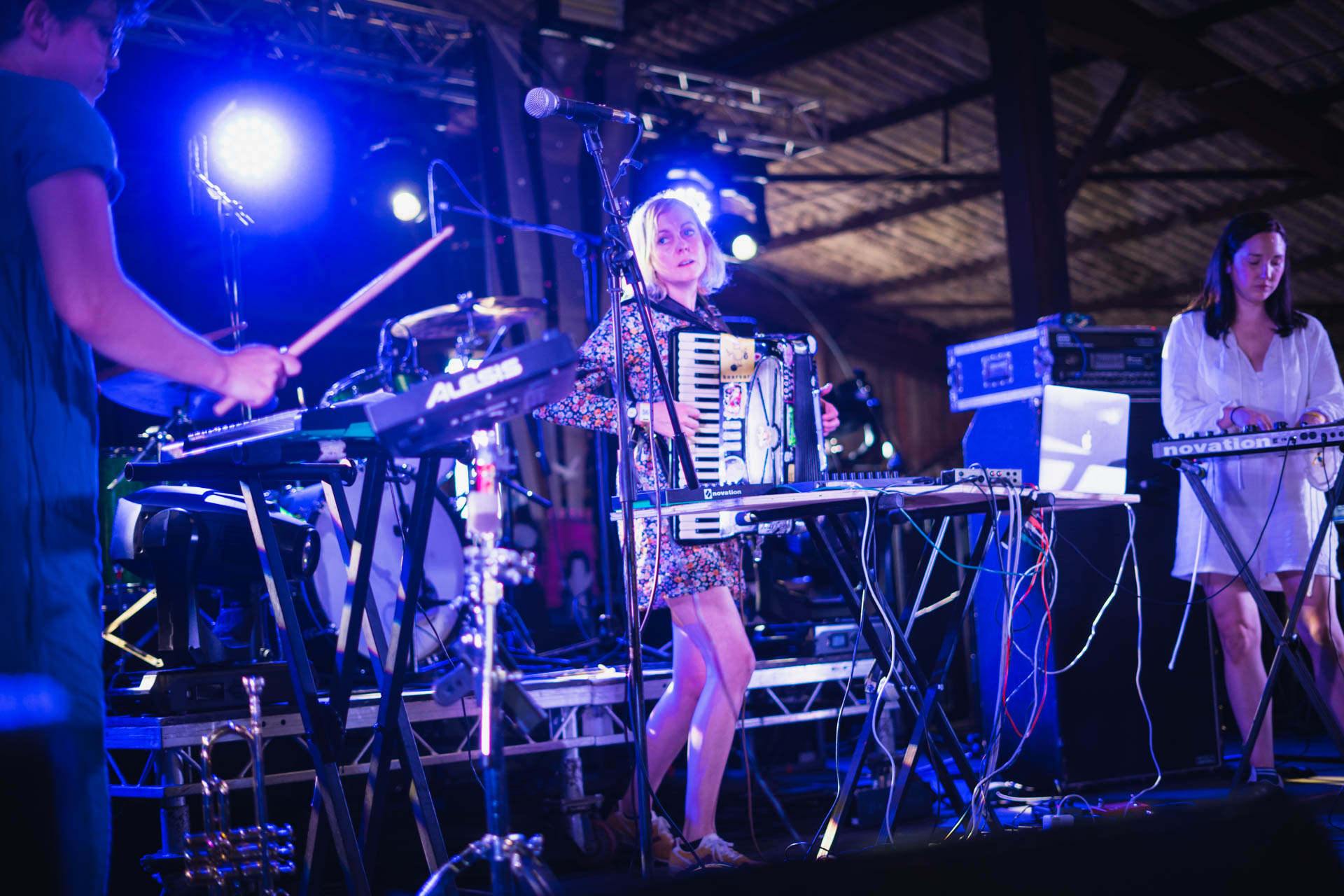
- in 2022

Background information
- Origin: Derbyshire, England
- Genres: Folktronica; post rock
- Years active: 2010–present
- Label: How Does It Feel To Be Loved?
- Members: Gemma Barkerwood; Sophie Barkerwood; Louise Croft
- Website: www.haikusalut.com

Haiku Salut are an instrumental trio from the Derbyshire Dales in England. Their music fuses elements of neoclassical, post rock, folk and electronica.

The trio consists of multi-instrumentalists Gemma Barkerwood, Sophie Barkerwood and Louise Croft. Between them, Haiku Salut play accordion, piano, glockenspiel, trumpet, trombone, guitar, ukulele, drums, malletkat, synth and melodica. Their music blends electronica and organic instrumentation.

== History ==
The group was formed in 2010, and their debut four track EP, How We Got Along After the Yarn Bomb, was released in 2011 on Team Strike Force records. Their debut album, Tricolore, was released in 2013 on How Does It Feel To Be Loved?. The album was favourably reviewed, and was awarded four stars by The Guardian, Uncut, Mojo, Artrocker, Drowned in Sound, Music OMH, and The Digital Fix. Songs from the album have been played on BBC 6 Music by Jarvis Cocker, Tom Ravenscroft and Gideon Coe.

In August 2013, Haiku Salut won the Green Man Rising contest, and were the first band to play on the Mountain Stage at that year's Green Man Festival. In November, the trio toured the UK as guests of Lau.

Haiku Salut's second album, Etch and Etch Deep, was released in 2015 to extremely positive reviews. It received four or more stars from The Guardian, The Financial Times, NME, Uncut, Mojo, Drowned in Sound, and many more.

Haiku Salut feature on the 2017 Public Service Broadcasting album Every Valley.

== Performances ==
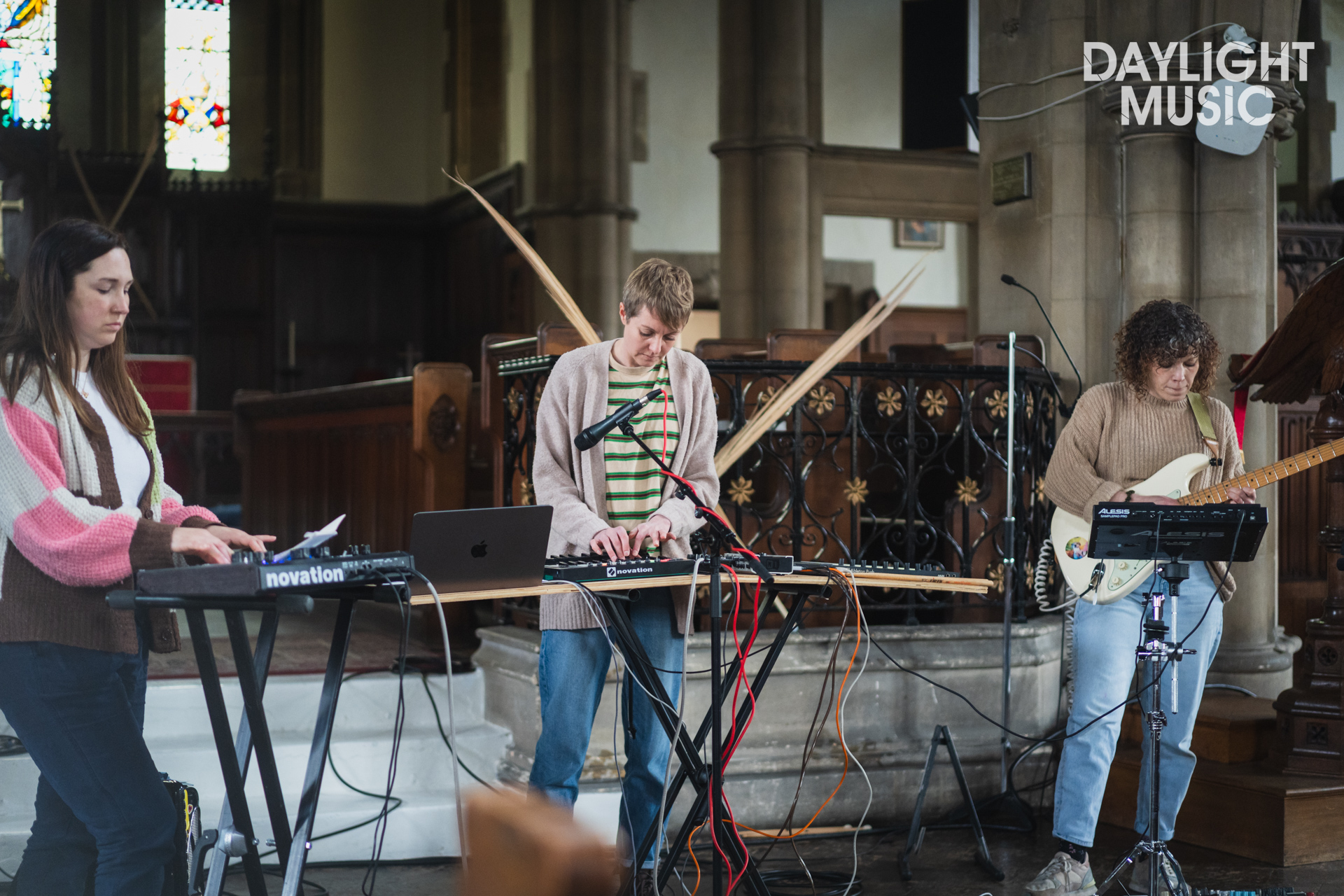
Performing in May 2026

In April 2013, the trio debuted their "lamp show", in which they are accompanied by 20 vintage lamps which are programmed to flash, fade and flicker in time to the music. The first lamp show performance was at Deda in Derby. The trio have since staged a number of further lamp show performances, including at the Indietracks festival in July 2013, and at St John on Bethnal Green church in October 2013 and October 2014. In September 2015, the band staged a UK tour of unusual spaces for the lamp show, playing a ballroom, a church, a theatre, a library, and a community centre. In August 2018, Haiku Salut performed live with The Robot Orchestra, as part of The Hexagon Experiment during the Great Exhibition Of The North. In September 2018, the band debuted a Virtual Reality Experience based around the VR video for their song, "Occupy".

== Discography ==
=== Albums ===
- Tricolore (2013)
- Etch & Etch Deep (2015)
- There Is No Elsewhere (2018)
- The General (2019)
- The Hill, The Light, The Ghost (2021)

=== Singles and EPs ===
- How We Got Along After The Yarn Bomb (2011)
- Haiku Salut / Hopeless Local Marching Band - Split (2012)
- Special Gift for Asia EP (2015)
- Pattern Thinker / Portrait In Dust (2020)
