= Rajasthan Council of Educational Administration and Management =

- Abbreviation: RCEAM
- Founded: June, 1995
- Type: Not for profit
- Headquarters: Udaipur, Rajasthan, India
- Coordinates: 24.597140°N 73.691936°E
- Region served: India
- President: Prof. (Dr.) Hemlata Talesra
- Affiliations: Commonwealth Council for Educational Administration and Management (CCEAM)
- Website: www.rceam.in
- Formerly called: Rajasthan Council of Educational Administration (RCEA)

Rajasthan Council of Educational Administration and Management (RCEAM) affiliated to Commonwealth Council for Educational Administration and Management (CCEAM) is an organization in Udaipur, Rajasthan, India.

== History ==
The council was established in the year 1995 and works in the field of educational administration, management, leadership, human rights, women empowerment and education of SC/ ST and weaker sections of the Society.
