= The Race for Space (album) =

Studio album by Public Service Broadcasting
- Released: 23 February 2015
- Studios: Jacamar Ltd., London; The Pool Studios, London; Abbey Road Studios, London
- Genres: Alternative rock; indie rock; electronic; ambient; post-rock
- Length: 43:40
- Label: Test Card Recordings
- Producers: J. Willgoose, Esq.

Public Service Broadcasting chronology
Inform-Educate-Entertain (2013)	The Race for Space (2015)	Every Valley (2017)

Singles from The Race for Space
- 1. "Go!" Released: 8 May 2015; 2. "The Other Side" Released: 28 August 2015; 3. "Sputnik EP" Released: 20 November 2015

The Race for Space is the second studio album by British alternative group Public Service Broadcasting, released on 23 February 2015. Working with sound samples from the British Film Institute, the album relives the story of the American and Soviet space race from 1957–1972. The opening track features the speech by John F. Kennedy on 12 September 1962 at Rice University.

To launch the album, the band played two concerts on 26 and 27 February 2015 at the National Space Centre in Leicester and went on to complete a 14-date tour of the UK and Ireland to support the album. The band have expressed concern in the past about playing the whole album cover to cover live, due to the subject matter of track 4 ("Fire in the Cockpit") but did so for the first time at Manchester Science Festival in October 2016.

The album reached number 11 in the UK chart and number 1 in the UK Indie Albums Chart the week following its release. The vinyl edition was the 5th highest selling record of 2015 in the UK.

On 25 July 2019, to commemorate the 50th anniversary of the Apollo Moon landing in 1969, Public Service Broadcasting performed a specially commissioned new orchestral arrangement of the album at the Royal Albert Hall in London, as part of the summer's Proms programme. The performance was broadcast live on BBC Radio 3 and the day after on BBC Four. The group had also performed album track "Go!" live on BBC Two's Newsnight programme on the eve of the fiftieth anniversary. In November 2025, the band announced the intention to mark the 10th anniversary of the album release which had already passed, but due to a full schedule, branded it as 10+1 with a full-scale gig at Alexandra Palace on 26 September 2026. The whole album was played live in running order, except for "Gagarin" moving to the encore and "Korolev" (a non-album track, but still themed to the space race) being inserted in its place.

== Background ==
The events covered on the album include the launch of Sputnik 1, the Apollo 1 fire, and the Vostok 1, Voskhod 2, Vostok 6, Apollo 8, Apollo 11 and Apollo 17 missions.

== Reception ==
Professional ratings
Aggregate scores
Source	Rating
Metacritic	73/100
Review scores
Source	Rating
The Arts Desk	4/5 stars
The Austin Chronicle	3/4 stars
Clash	7/10
DIY	3/5 stars
Drowned in Sound	8/10
The Guardian	3/5 stars
The Irish Times	3/5 stars
The Independent	positive
The Observer	4/5 stars
State	5/5 stars

=== Critical reception ===
Upon its release, The Race for Space was met with largely positive reviews from music critics. Most reviews praised the band's choice of theme and commented heavily on the album's use of tone and instrumentation to depict certain events in the space race. While most critics unanimously praised upbeat tracks such as "Gagarin" and "The Other Side", they were somewhat divided on other tracks on the album, such as "Fire in the Cockpit" and "Valentina", which drew, if any, minor criticism. In comparison to the band's debut album, Inform-Educate-Entertain, critics also believed that The Race for Space had elevated the band from a "novelty act", and praised the album as a concept album that improves on its predecessor. At Metacritic, which assigns a normalized rating out of 100 to reviews from mainstream critics, the album received an average score of 73, which indicates "Generally favorable reviews", based on 12 reviews as of December 2015.

Kevin Harley, writing in The Independent, wrote that the band proved themselves with the album; "there’s fuel enough for manoeuvre in pop that’s piloted with intelligence, energy, craft and atmospheric control, even if it seems frightfully, stiflingly high-concept." He commented on the band's departure form the rock-centric sounds of Inform-Educate-Entertain to a more electronic sound, relating the band's move to the album's opening track, with John F. Kennedy's speech for "change and challenge". He also further praised the album's mood tonal shifts, and concluded the review by stating, "[The Race for Space] is richly entertaining, immersive and evocative, orchestrated with fastidious care and feeling." In a review for State, Phil Udell praised the album, and its space race theme, as giving the band's sound "a new dimension". He comments on The Race for Space's music taking "more of a backseat than [Inform-Educate-Entertain]", and goes on to write in praise of "The Other Side".

To encompass such a momentous period in human history into one record – and a short one at that – may have seemed like an act of high folly but, like their forebears, Public Service Broadcasting have chosen this path not because it is easy, but because it is hard. The results are stellar.

— Phil Udell

In his review of the album for Drowned in Sound, Marc Burrows wrote that "the joy [in The Race for Space] is in how the duo marry theme and function", citing specifically the album's instrumentals and their fit to the archival recordings used, such as "the beeping signal of the pioneering "Russian moon" built into the loping, housy rhythm of 'Sputnik'", and "'E.V.A''s portrayal of Alexei Leonov’s first spacewalk through quietly disorientating switches in timing and mood, breaking from excitement and speed to a gentle drifting." He also commented on the album's unbiased use of both positive and tragic moments from the space race as context to the music; something Harley had also noted in his review. Burrows also notably concluded the review describing "The Other Side", as "history and melody and wonder hitting you all at once in a moment of complete joy and release. Just wonderful." At The Arts Desk, Thomas H Green wrote that The Race for Space is an effective reminder of "the 1960s media's wild excitement about the space race" and "the era when every boy wanted to be an astronaut", which had been "almost forgotten". He also stated that the band took advantage of the current trends in electronic music, such as sampling, comparing them to The Egg, in a positive light. He wrote that The Race for Space was "a rich and thoroughly enjoyable nine-track journey", and that the band "reinvented the concept album as a delightful, historically engaged rave-up."

Phil Mongredien of The Observer stated that the album's space race theme was a "smart move", noting the band's use of "finely judged soundscapes", while his counterpart, Jenny Stevens, writing for the parent newspaper The Guardian, wrote that the album "does little to provoke", stating it was "less intrepid than its source material." Tony Clayton-Lea, writing for The Irish Times, challenged its replay value, stating that while "It’s all nicely “out there”, with music channelling Kraftwerk and Aphex Twin... whether you’d want to listen to it more than a few times is debatable."

=== Accolades ===
Publication	Accolade	Year	Rank
Rough Trade	Albums of the Year 2015	2015	24

== Track listing ==
No.	Title	Inspiring event	Length
1.	"The Race for Space"	John F. Kennedy's September 1962 speech	2:41
2.	"Sputnik"	Sputnik 1 (1957 - First satellite)	7:09
3.	"Gagarin"	Vostok 1 (1961 - First human in space)	3:49
4.	"Fire in the Cockpit"	Apollo 1 disaster (1967 - First planned Apollo mission)	3:02
5.	"E.V.A."	Voskhod 2 (1965 - First spacewalk)	4:16
6.	"The Other Side"	Apollo 8 (1968 - First human orbit of the Moon)	6:20
7.	"Valentina" (featuring Smoke Fairies)	Vostok 6 (1963 - First woman and first civilian in space)	4:29
8.	"Go!"	Apollo 11 (1969 - First Moon landing by a crewed spacecraft)	4:13
9.	"Tomorrow"	Apollo 17 (1972 - Final Apollo mission)	7:22
Total length:			43:21

== Personnel ==
Credits adapted from The Race for Space liner notes.

Public Service Broadcasting

- J Willgoose, Esq. - guitars, synths, bass, banjo, percussion, sampling
- Wrigglesworth - drums, vibraphone and handclaps

Production

- Joe Rubel - engineer at Abbey Road Studios
- Matt Mysko - assistant engineer at Abbey Road Studios
- Stefano Civetta - second assistant engineer at Abbey Road Studios
- Sam Wheat - recorder, engineer at The Pool Studios
- Jonathan Sagis - assistant engineer at The Pool Studios
- Tim Young - mastering at Metropolis Studios

Artwork

- Rich Andrews - band photography
- Graham Pilling - album cover, artwork design

Arrangement

- JF Abraham - trumpet, brass arrangement (track 3)
- Peter Gregson - choir arrangement (tracks 1, 9), string arrangement (tracks 3–5, 9)
- Jenny O’Grady - choir director

Featured musicians

- Katherine Blamire - vocals (track 7)
- Jessica Davies - vocals (track 7)

Additional musicians

- Richard Andrews - piano (track 5)
- Mircea Belei - viola (tracks 3, 5)
- Leah Evans - cello (tracks 3–5, 9)
- Thomas Greed - violin (track 3, 5)
- David Larkin - violin (tracks 3, 5)
- Iain Maxwell - trombone (track 3)
- John Moore - baritone saxophone (track 3)
- Alex Parish - handclaps (track 8), "and tea" [sic]
- Guy Passey - alto saxophone (track 3)
- Sebastian Philpott - trumpet (track 3)
- Jonathan Sagis - handclaps (track 8)
- Christopher Smith - trombone (track 3)
- Joe Stoddart - bass (track 3)
- Clementine Vale - cello (tracks 3–5, 9)

Vocalists (Choir)

- Kate Bishop - alto (tracks 1, 9)
- Ruth Kiang - alto (tracks 1, 9)
- Eleanor Minney - alto (tracks 1, 9)
- Helen Parker - alto (tracks 1, 9)
- Emma Brain-Gabbott - soprano (tracks 1, 9)
- Joanna Forbes L'Estrange - soprano, chorus master (tracks 1, 9)
- Chloë Morgan - soprano (tracks 1, 9)
- Ann De Renais - soprano (tracks 1, 9)
- Ben Fleetwood Smyth - tenor (tracks 1, 9)
- Paul Grier - bass (tracks 1, 9)
- James Mawson - bass (tracks 1, 9)
- Lawrence Wallington - bass (tracks 1, 9)
- Lawrence White - bass (tracks 1, 9)

== Charts ==
Chart (2015)	Peak position
New Zealand Albums (Recorded Music NZ)	25
Scottish Albums (Official Charts)	14
UK Albums (Official Charts)	11
UK Album Downloads (Official Charts)	19
UK Independent Albums (Official Charts)	1
UK Progressive Albums (Official Charts)	3

== Certifications ==
Region	Certification	Certified units/sales
United Kingdom (BPI)	Gold	100,000^{‡}
^{‡} Sales+streaming figures based on certification alone.

== Remix album ==
In June 2016, a CD of remixes was released. Included is a song based on Sergei Korolev, which was included on the Sputnik CD single. This version of the album reached number 59 in the UK album charts.

No.	Title	Length
1.	"E.V.A. (Vessels)"	5:52
2.	"Tomorrow (Copy Paste Soul Remix)"	6:44
3.	"Go! (Kauf Remix)"	4:26
4.	"The Other Side (Maps Remix)"	5:23
5.	"Korolev (Field Music Remix)"	4:19
6.	"Sputnik (Petar Dundov Remix)"	6:16
7.	"Valentina (feat. Smoke Fairies) (Boxed In Remix)"	5:59
8.	"E.V.A. (Dutch Uncles Remix)"	4:40
9.	"Gagarin (Psychemagik Remix)"	5:23
10.	"Korolev (Robert Babicz Remix)"	6:00
11.	"Go! (Errors Remix)"	4:13
12.	"Sputnik (Blond:ish Remix)"	12:39
