= Profit in Your Poetry =

Profit In Your Poetry

Studio album by Butcher Boy
- Released: 5 March 2007
- Recorded: 2006
- Genre: Indie pop
- Length: 30:32
- Label: HDIF Records

Butcher Boy chronology
Profit In Your Poetry (2007)	React or Die (2009)

Professional ratings
Review scores
Source	Rating
Allmusic	link
Drowned in Sound	link
The Guardian	link
Is This Music?	Spring 2007
The List	link
Metro	12 March 2007
The Skinny	March 2007
Uncut	April 2007

Profit In Your Poetry is the debut studio album by Butcher Boy. It was released on 5 March 2007 on HDIF Records.

== Track listing ==
1. "Trouble And Desire" (2:34)
2. "There Is No-One Who Can Tell You Where You've Been" (2:30)
3. "Profit In Your Poetry" (3:09)
4. "I Could Be In Love With Anyone" (3:00)
5. "I Lost Myself" (3:19)
6. "Girls Make Me Sick" (3:22)
7. "I Know Who You Could Be" (2:40)
8. "Fun" (4:21)
9. "Keep Your Powder Dry" (2:16)
10. "Day Like These Will Be The Death Of Me" (3:24)
