= Butcher Boy (band) =

Scottish indie pop band

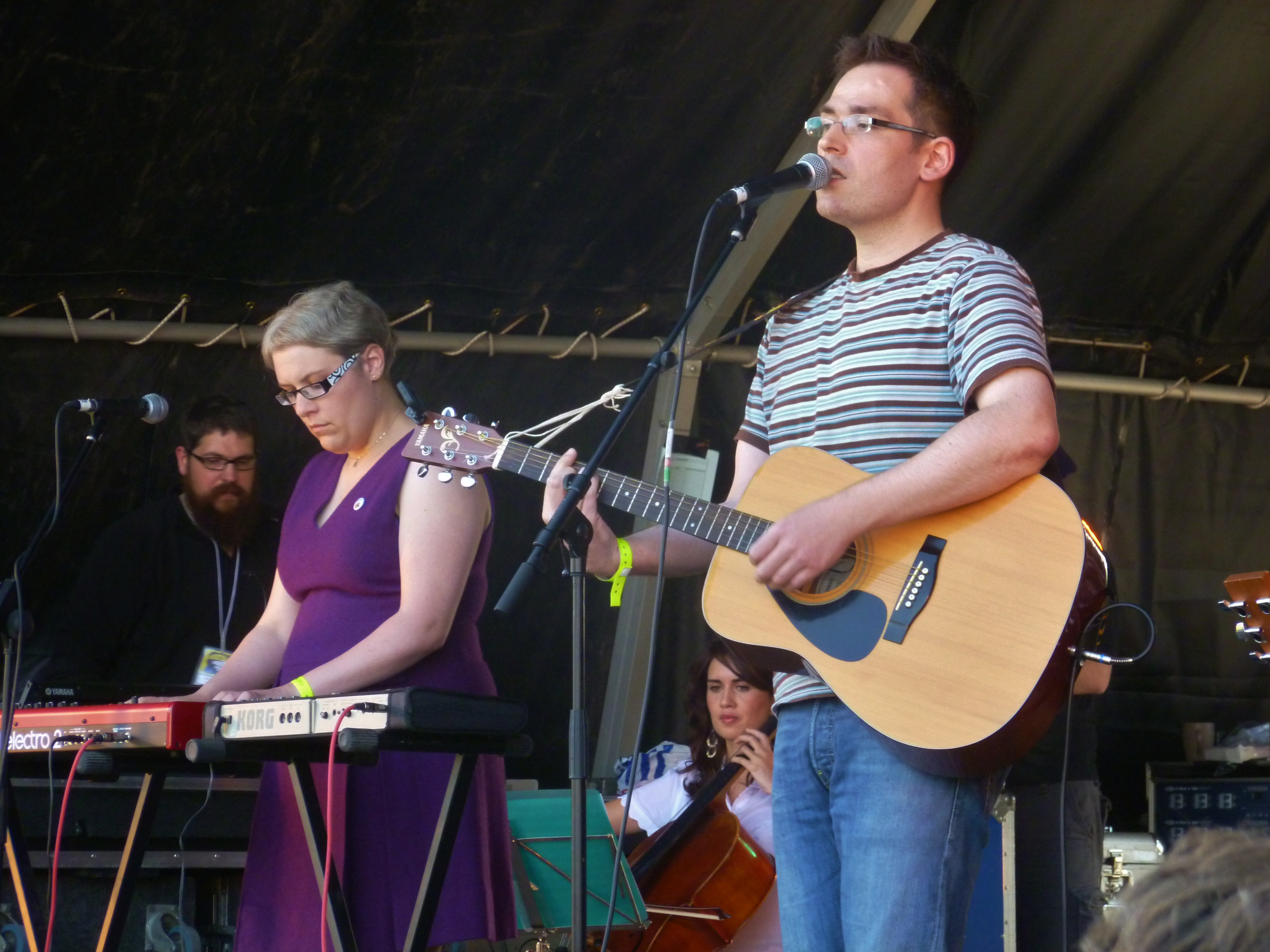

Background information
- Origin: Glasgow, Scotland, United Kingdom
- Genres: Indie pop
- Years active: 1998–present
- Labels: HDIF Records
- Members: Maya Burman-Roy; Alison Eales; Fraser Ford; John Blain Hunt; Findlay MacKinnon; Aoife Magee; Basil Pieroni; Robert Spark; Garry Hoggan
- Past members: Jenny Diep; Andy Forrester; Jacqui Grant; Keith Martin; Gina Murphy; Susan Vennard

Butcher Boy are an indie pop band from Glasgow, Scotland. Formed in 1998, they released their album Profit in Your Poetry in 2007. Their second album, React or Die, was released on 13 April 2009.

== History ==
The band was formed in 1998 by lead singer and songwriter John Blain Hunt (well known in the Scott Glasgow indie music scene as the organiser of club night National Pop League). Hunt had previously used 'Butcher Boy' as a pen name when submitting poetry to newspapers. The band has its roots in Ayrshire (where Hunt grew up) but is now Glasgow-based. The core band has been augmented by string and brass musicians for live performances and recordings.

On record, they first appeared in August 2006 on the HDIF label's compilation The Kids at the Club with their song "Days Like This Will Be the Death of Me", described as "wonderful" (though "Smiths-indebted") by The Guardian. Their first album, Profit in Your Poetry, was released in April 2007 (having been preceded by download-only single, "Girls Make Me Sick") and attracted overwhelmingly positive reviews, described as "flipping from string-skirling kitchen sink dramas to Motown bluster", "a promising debut", and having "an instant and addictive charm that even Mozzer would be proud of". Reviewers detected influences such as Tindersticks, Felt, Love, Belle & Sebastian, and the Chameleons.

The band released an EP, The Eighteenth Emergency, in September 2007, to tie in with several live dates in Glasgow and a short tour of England.

In May 2008 the track "I Know Who You Could Be" from Profit in Your Poetry, was used in the US TV drama series Moonlight. The song can be heard during the final scene of episode 14, which was edited so that the song could be used in its entirety.

Their second album, React or Die, was released on 13 April 2009, preceded by the single "A Better Ghost". The band have made a video for the single, filmed in part at the Britannia Panopticon Music Hall in Glasgow.

== Members ==
The current members are:

- Maya Burman-Roy: 2007–present (cello)
- Alison Eales: 2005–present (keyboards, accordion)
- Fraser Ford: 2008–present (guitar, keyboards)
- John Blain Hunt: 1998–present (vocals, guitar)
- Findlay MacKinnon: 2005–present (drums, percussion)
- Aoife Magee: 2004–present (viola)
- Basil Pieroni: 2005–present (guitar)
- Garry Hoggan: 2003–2008, 2019–present (bass guitar)
- Robert Spark: 2008–present (bass guitar)

Former members are:

- Jenny Diep: 2007 (cello, keyboards)
- Andy Forrester: 1998–2003 (bass guitar, drums)
- Jacqui Grant: 2001–2007 (cello)
- Keith Martin: 2000–2001 (drums)
- Gina Murphy: 2001–2003 (keyboards)
- Susan Vennard: 1998–2000 (keyboards)

== Discography ==
=== Albums ===
- Profit in Your Poetry (2007)
- React or Die (2009)
- Helping Hands (2011)
- You Had A Kind Face (2022)

=== EPs ===
- The Eighteenth Emergency EP (2007)
- Bad Things Happen When it's Quiet EP (2017)

=== Singles ===
- "Girls Make Me Sick" (2007)
- "Carve a Pattern" (2009)
- "A Better Ghost" (2009)
- "Imperial" (2011)
