= React or Die =

Studio album by Butcher Boy
- Released: 13 April 2009
- Recorded: 2008
- Genre: Indie pop
- Length: 31:10
- Label: HDIF Records

Butcher Boy chronology
Profit In Your Poetry (2007)	React or Die (2009)

Professional ratings
Review scores
Source	Rating
NME	4/5 stars
Sunday Telegraph	5/5 stars
The Skinny	March 2009
The Times	link

React or Die is the second album by Butcher Boy. It was released on 13 April 2009 on HDIF Records.

== Track listing ==
1. "When I'm Asleep" (2:55)
2. "Carve A Pattern" (4:15)
3. "You're Only Crying For Yourself" (3:30)
4. "Anything Other Than Kind" (3:33)
5. "This Kiss Will Marry Us" (4:50)
6. "A Better Ghost" (2:05)
7. "Clockwork" (2:53)
8. "Why I Like Babies" (2:59)
9. "Sunday Bells" (2:23)
10. "React or Die" (1:48)
