= Red Asphalt =

Driver's education videos

Red Asphalt is a series of instructional driver's education films and videos produced by the California Highway Patrol, known for their graphic depictions of fatal traffic collisions in a shockumentary style. Horrendously injured and dismembered bodies are shown, typically those of negligent drivers. The original film was produced in 1960, and four sequels have been produced over the following decades. Over the years, many have questioned whether the film actually has a long-term impact on students' driving.

Red Asphalt was originally conceived as a Californian version of the similar 1959 film Signal 30. According to The Los Angeles Times, "The original [1960] 16-millimeter black-and-white version of Red Asphalt was compiled from newsreel footage. Screened in driver's education classes at a time when violence was rarely depicted in movies and never shown on TV, its graphic nature immediately turned it into a teenage classic." Red Asphalt III, produced in 1989, showed "stomach-churning wreckage scenes and images of mangled bodies, crushed skulls and charred flesh." The fourth version, produced in 1998, was a more "tasteful" affair, focusing on rescuers and family members rather than the original's graphic crash footage.

The series was criticized in 2006 by the Los Angeles Times for its poor acting and being a "joyless ride" of gruesome images and statistics; the paper called Red Asphalt "the Reefer Madness of driving: Forget trying to reason with teenagers, just scare 'em."

== Installments ==
- 1960: Red Asphalt
- 1978: Red Asphalt II
- 1989: Red Asphalt III
- 1998: Red Asphalt IV
- 2006: Red Asphalt V
