= Tricolore (album) =

Studio album by Haiku Salut
- Released: 16 April 2013
- Genre: Pop, Rock
- Length: 37:30
- Label: How Does It Feel To Be Loved?

Haiku Salut chronology
| How We Got Along After The Yarn Bomb (2011) | Tricolore (2013) | Etch & Etch Deep (2015) |

Professional ratings
Aggregate scores
| Source | Rating |
|---|---|
| Metacritic | 81/100 |
Review scores
| Source | Rating |
| BPM | 69% |
| MusicOMH | 4/5 stars |
| Drowned In Sound | 8/10 |
| The Guardian | 4/5 stars |
| Contact Music | 8/10 |

Tricolore is the debut album by Derbyshire trio Haiku Salut. The album was released in April 2013 under How Does It Feel To Be Loved? record label.

== Track listing ==
| No. | Title | Length |
|---|---|---|
| 1. | "Say It" | 0:33 |
| 2. | "Sounds Like There's A Pacman Crunching Away At Your Heart" | 4:55 |
| 3. | "Leaf Stricken" | 2:26 |
| 4. | "Los Elefantes" | 3:16 |
| 5. | "Lonesome George (Orwell, There's No-One Like)" | 2:43 |
| 6. | "Watanabe" | 4:16 |
| 7. | "Haiku Interlude #1" | 0:46 |
| 8. | "Six Impossible Things" | 4:06 |
| 9. | "Rustic Sense of Migration" | 3:16 |
| 10. | "Glockelbar" | 2:16 |
| 11. | "Train Tracks For Wheezy (Featuring A Little Orchestra)" | 5:15 |
| 12. | "No, You Say It" | 3:42 |
