= Anna Lena Bruland =

Norwegian singer/songwriter

Anna Lena Bruland, also known as EERA, is a Norwegian singer/songwriter.

== Career ==
Brought up in Drøbak, a fishing town near Oslo, Bruland left Norway to study music in the UK at the age of 18. Playing with a number of bands, she founded gothic-pop group Anna Lena and the Orchids before relaunching herself as EERA. She released an eponymous EP in 2016. She subsequently relocated to Berlin.

Her first album, Reflection of Youth, was made with instrumentalist and producer Allister Kellaway and drummer Ed Bernez and released in 2017. The album, recorded in Wales, was released on Big Dada. Her second album, Speak, was released in 2021 to critical acclaim. A number of side projects included providing the vocals for British supernatural drama The Innocents, composed by Carly Paradis, which won a Hollywood Music in Media Award in 2018 for original song, and collaborations with British group Public Service Broadcasting. Bruland provided the vocals for Public Service Broadcasting's People Let's Dance, released as the first single from the album Bright Magic and performed with the group as well as supporting on their 2021 Bright Magic tour. She went on to provide vocals and perform as the supporting act on PSB's 2025 European tour.

== Personal life ==
The song "10,000 Voices" (on Reflection of Youth) is a reference to her grandfather, musician and former conductor of the Oslo Philharmonic Orchestra, Sverre Bruland.
