= Vanasthali =

- Census town
- Location in Rajasthan, India Vanasthali (India)
- Coordinates: 26.4083°N 75.8649°E
- Country: India
- State: Rajasthan
- District: Tonk

Population (2001)
  - Total: 6,676

Languages
  - Official: Hindi
- Time zone: UTC+5:30 (IST)
- ISO 3166 code: RJ-IN

Vanasthali is a census town in Tonk district in the Indian state of Rajasthan.

== Demographics ==
As of 2001 India census, Vanasthali had a population of 6,676. Males constitute 31% of the population and females 69%. Vanasthali has an average literacy rate of 82%, higher than the national average of 59.5%: male literacy is 77%, and female literacy is 84%. In Vanasthali, 9% of the population is under 6 years of age.

== See also ==
Banasthali Vidyapith
