= International Association of Educators =

International nonprofit organization

Established on September 18, 2002, in Chicago, the US, the International Association of Educators is a non-profit, non-partisan and non-governmental international organization. It aims to develop new pedagogies and alternative languages for multi-cultural communication and understanding. The association provides the global communications spheres for its members from 46 countries and 1250 universities in order to contribute to world peace through education.

== Publications ==
The association sponsors the following journals:

- International Journal of Progressive Education, a peer reviewed electronic journal. It takes an interdisciplinary approach to its general aim of promoting an open and continuing dialogue about current educational issues and future conceptions of educational theory and practice in an international context. The journal provides an online discussion-forum for its readers to write instant comments on articles. It is co-sponsored by the Graduate School of Library and Information Science at the University of Illinois at Urbana-Champaign and is published three times a year in four languages; Chinese, Turkish, Spanish and English. The current editor in chief is Chen Xinren (Nanjing University, China).
- Educational Policy Analysis and Strategic Research (Turkish: Eğitimde Politika Analizleri ve Stratejik Araştırmalar Dergisi), a peer-reviewed academic journal. The journal is published both in English and Turkish. The journal covers Education policy and evaluation, strategic research and planning, postmodernism, globalization, and education and was established in 2006. The editors in chief are Nihat Gürel Kahveci (Istanbul University) and Mehmet Durdu Karsli (Eastern Mediterranean University).

== Administration ==
The International Association of Educators is run by an executive committee elected every 2 years. The current president is Mustafa Yunus Eryaman (University of Hamburg) .
