= How Does It Feel to Be Loved? =

Nightclub in London, England

Coordinates: 51.5160°N 0.1436°W

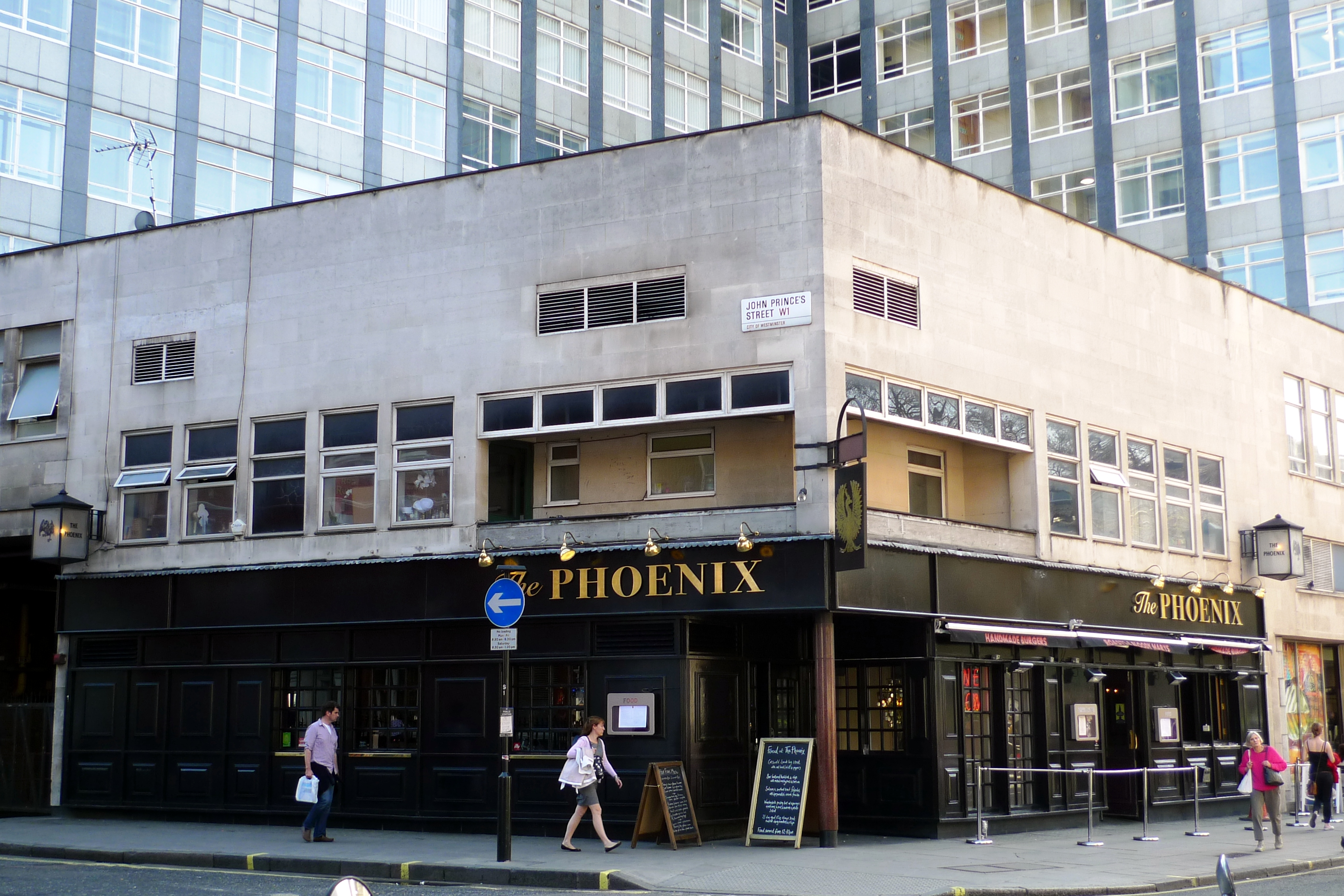
The Phoenix, Marylebone

How Does It Feel to Be Loved? (often abbreviated to HDIF) is a London-based nightclub which predominantly plays indie pop, Northern Soul and Motown music. On the club's website, founder Ian Watson explains: "We love pop, we love guitars that jangle, we love foot stomping melodies and huge choruses." The club's name is taken from the lyrics to The Velvet Underground song "Beginning to See the Light".

== History ==
Watson, a former Melody Maker journalist, began the night in April 2002 at The Buffalo Bar in Islington.

HDIF takes place on the third Saturday of the month at Signature Brew in Haggerston, east London. Over the years, HDIF has taken place in a variety of venues in the capital, including the 100 Club on Oxford Street, The Phoenix on Cavendish Square, The Canterbury Arms, The Windmill and Jamm in Brixton, Buffalo Bar in Highbury, The Grosvenor in Stockwell, Nambucca in Archway, The Shacklewell Arms in Dalston, The Crypt in Camberwell and the Montague Arms in Peckham. It ran from 2003 to 2015 at the Canterbury Arms, and was "Brixton's longest running indie club night".

Press for the HDIF has been extremely positive. "Legendary indie club," said the NME. "Much-loved indie pop institution," wrote The Quietus. "With a decade of great nights under its belt How Does it Feel to Be Loved? is one of London's most enduring and influential underground indie get-togethers," said Flavorpill. "A speakeasy for anyone who suspects that their life is one big Smiths song," declared Big Issue. In January 2015, it was named one of "London's best indie nights" by Time Out.

== Notable DJs ==
Guest DJs have included:

- Belle & Sebastian's Stuart Murdoch
- The Smiths producer Stephen Street
- The Wedding Present's David Gedge
- Camera Obscura singer Tracyanne Campbell and bass player Gavin Dunbar
- Felt singer Lawrence
- Teenage Fanclub's Norman Blake
- Dexys Midnight Runners singer Kevin Rowland
- Dan Treacy of the Television Personalities
- St Etienne's Bob Stanley
- Jon Slade of Huggy Bear/Comet Gain
- Darren Hayman
- Paul Court of The Primitives
- The Clientele singer Alasdair Maclean
- Amelia Fletcher of Talulah Gosh
- Theaudience founder Billy Reeves
- Chelsea and Everton footballer Pat Nevin
- The Pains of Being Pure at Heart
- Jeffrey Lewis

HDIF started running online Virtual Dance Parties in March 2020, with a DJ set streamed to mixlr and to a VR recreation of the Canterbury Arms hosted on Altspace. The following have DJ-ed at the virtual dance parties: Stuart Murdoch, Stevie Jackson and Chris Geddes of Belle & Sebastian, Stephin Merritt of The Magnetic Fields, Tracyanne Campbell of Camera Obscura, Jeffrey Lewis, Elizabeth Morris and Bill Botting of Allo Darlin', David Gedge of The Wedding Present, Amelia Fletcher of Talulah Gosh and Heavenly, Helen Love, Bobby Wratten of The Field Mice, Jim Reid of The Jesus and Mary Chain, Estella Adeyeri of Big Joanie, John Dwyer of Osees, comedians Josie Long and Stewart Lee, The Lovely Eggs, Huw Williams of The Pooh Sticks, Gail O'Hara of Chickfactor, Kip Berman of The Pains of Being Pure at Heart, Manda Rin of Bis, Martin Phillipps of The Chills, Norman Blake of Teenage Fanclub, Lloyd Cole, Duglas T Stewart of BMX Bandits, Wendy Pickles of The Popguns, Darren Hayman, Black Francis of Pixies, Beth Arzy of Jetstream Pony, Robert Lloyd of The Nightingales, Franic Rozycki of The Wave Pictures, Stephen McRobbie of The Pastels, Liz Stokes of The Beths, Ian Parton of The Go! Team, and Sean Tollefson of Tullycraft.

== Live shows ==
Since July 2005, HDIF has promoted live shows under the HDIF Presents banner. Bands featured have included:

- Sambassadeur
- Language of Flowers
- Saturday Looks Good to Me
- Lucky Soul
- Fanfarlo
- The Gresham Flyers
- Darren Hayman
- Tilly and the Wall
- Fosca
- Irene
- I'm From Barcelona
- Butcher Boy
- Brontosaurus Chorus
- Allo Darlin'
- This Many Boyfriends
- Cats on Fire
- The Band of Holy Joy
- A Fine Day for Sailing
- White Town
- Standard Fare
- Shrag
- Veronica Falls
- The Lodger
- God Help the Girl
- The Popguns
- The Pooh Sticks

== Label ==
In September 2006, HDIF's spin-off record label was launched with the release of the 19-track compilation The Kids at the Club and featured many of the acts who had played or DJ'd at HDIF nights.

The label has since gone on to release albums by Butcher Boy, Saturday Looks Good To Me, Antarctica Takes It!, Cats on Fire and Pocketbooks.

In June 2010, the first HDIF Podcast was recorded. Featuring songs played at the most recent club night, it featured the club's trademark mixture of indiepop and soul.

In December 2010, HDIF was part of the line up for Bowlie 2, the music festival curated by Belle & Sebastian.

In July 2011, the anthropologist Wendy Fonarow cited HDIF in her Indie Professor column in The Guardian. Discussing the differences between American and British indie music, she commented: "Indie is the diminutive of independent and often has names that are self-conscious, small and innocent: Sarah, Heavenly, Postcard, Fierce Panda, Mute or How Does it Feel to Be Loved?"

From 2011 onwards, HDIF has been part of the line up for the End of the Road Festival, playing two sets: one in the afternoon for children at the Forest Disco, and a late night one for adults.

Elizabeth Morris of Allo Darlin' stated in an interview in the 2011 End of the Road Festival programme that the band's initial ambition was to have one of their songs played at HDIF. She later revealed: "This club inspired a lot of our songs, including 'Dreaming' and 'Polaroid Song'."

After a break of three years, the HDIF label was revived in 2013, with the release of the debut album by Haiku Salut, titled Tricolore. The label released Haiku Salut's second album, "Etch and Etch Deep", in 2015. The label changed its name to Secret Name in 2019, and released two more albums by Haiku Salut - "The General" in 2019 and "The Hill, The Light, The Ghost" in 2021.

In 2014, HDIF published a collection of haiku by Haiku Salut. The book was called "Japanese Poems Steal Brains" and was illustrated by Katrine Brosnan. In 2025, HDIF became an imprint of Secret Name Books, ahead of the publication of Watson's debut novel, "The Tunnels", on February 26th, 2026. The novel was reviewed in the Financial Times who said: "The Tunnels embodies a very English sense of absurdity, putting Lewis Carroll, Monty Python and Douglas Adams in a blender with a generous helping of pop-culture references and fantasy motifs.”
