= Commonwealth Council for Educational Administration and Management =

Commonwealth Council of Educational Administration and Management
- Abbreviation: CCEAM
- Founded: 1970
- Type: Not for profit
- Headquarters: Ontario, Canada
- President: Prof. Paul Miller
- Affiliations: Commonwealth Consortium for Education (CCfE)
- Website: www.cceam.net
- Formerly called: Commonwealth Council of Educational Administration (CCEA)

The Commonwealth Council for Educational Administration and Management (CCEAM) is affiliated to the Commonwealth Consortium for Education (CCfE) established in 1970. It is a part of Commonwealth Family.

== History ==
CCEAM came into existence as the Commonwealth Council of Educational Administration (CCEA) in 1970 at the University of New England, Australia.

== Affiliates ==
=== Asia ===
India

India has 7 chapters, as following:

- Assam – ACEAM
- Gujarat – GCEAM
- Kerala – KCEAM
- Maharashtra –MCEAM
- Nagpur – NCEAM
- Rajasthan – RCEAM
- Uttar Pradesh – UCEAM

Malaysia

- Malaysian Society for Educational Administration and Management

=== Pacific ===
New Zealand

Papua New Guinea

Tonga

=== Europe ===
Malta

United Kingdom

=== Caribbean and Americas ===
Barbados

Canada

Jamaica

Trinidad and Tobago

St Vincents and Grenadines

=== East and West Africa ===
Cameroon

Kenya

Nigeria

Seychelles

Uganda

=== Southern Africa ===
Namibia

South Africa

United Republic of Tanzania
