= European Educational Research Association =

The European Educational Research Association (EERA) is an association of national and regional associations representing educational researchers in Europe. EERA aims to encourage collaboration amongst educational researchers in Europe, promote communication between educational researchers and international governmental organisations and disseminate and highlight state-of-the-art findings of educational research, primarily through the annual European Conference on Educational Research (ECER) and its associated journal, the European Educational Research Journal (EERJ), the EERA Blog and the EERA Book Series - Transdisciplinary Perspectives in Educational Research.

== History ==
EERA was founded in June 1994 as a result of discussions among many national educational research associations and several major research institutes throughout Europe which identified the need for a European association to foster the exchange of ideas amongst European researchers, promote collaboration in research, improve research quality and offer independent advice on educational research and policies to European and national policy-makers, administrators and practitioners. From 1994 to 2007, EERA was constituted as a Charity under British Law and based in Glasgow, Scotland. Since 2008, EERA has been operating from its new office in Berlin, Germany, and is constituted as a non-profit organisation under German Law.

== Objectives ==
EERA aims to promote collaboration among educational researchers and their respective associations in Europe. It promotes communication between educational researchers and international governmental organisations, such as the EU, Council of Europe, OECD, and UNESCO. Furthermore, EERA seeks to disseminate the findings of educational research and to ensure that the contribution of educational research to policy and practice is recognized and desired.

== Membership ==
EERA is constituted as an association of associations (i.e. there are no individual members). Its membership is made up of more than 30 national and regional Educational Research Associations from all parts of wider Europe.

=== EERA member associations ===
- Albania - CDE Center for Democratic Education
- Armenia – Educational Research Armenian Centre
- Austria – Österreichische Gesellschaft für Forschung und Entwicklung im Bildungswesen
- Belarus – Belarus National Association "Innovations in Education" (IE)
- Belgium – Association Belge des Chercheurs en Education and Vlaams Forum voor Onderwijsonderzoek
- Cyprus – Cyprus Pedagogical Association, and Cyprus Educational Sciences Association
- Czech Republic – Česká asociace pedagogického výzkumu
- Denmark – Nordic Educational Research Association
- Estonia – Eesti Akadeemiline Pedagoogika Selts
- Finland – Finnish Educational Research Association and Nordic Educational Research Association
- France – Association des Enseignants et Chercheurs en Sciences de l'Education
- Germany – Deutsche Gesellschaft für Erziehungswissenschaft
- Greece – Hellenic Educational Society
- Hungary – Hungarian Educational Research Association
- Iceland – Nordic Educational Research Association
- Ireland – Educational Studies Association of Ireland
- Italy – Società Italiana di Pedagogia
- Kazakhstan – Kazakhstan Educational Research Association (KERA)
- Lithuania – Lithuanian Educational Research Association
- Luxembourg - University of Luxembourg
- Malta - Malta Educational Research Association
- Netherlands – Vereniging voor Onderwijs Research
- Norway – Nordic Educational Research Association
- Poland – Polskie Towarzystwo Pedagogiczne
- Portugal – Centro de Investigação, Difusão e Intervenção Educacional and Sociedade Portuguesa de Ciências da Educação
- Romania - University of Bucharest
- Russia - RERA, Educational Research Association Russia
- Serbia - DIOS Društvo istraživača u obrazovanju u Srbiji (Educational Research Association of Serbia-ERAS)
- Slovakia – Slovenskápedagogická spoločnosť
- Slovenia – Slovensko društvoraziskovalcev na področju edukacije
- Spain – Asociación Interuniversitaria de Investigación Pedagógica and Sociedad Española de Pedagogía
- Sweden – Nordic Educational Research Association
- Switzerland – Schweizerische Gesellschaft für Bildungsforschung
- Turkey – Eğitim Araştırmaları Birliği and Eğitim Yöneticileri ve Eğitim Deneticileri Derneği
- United Kingdom – British Educational Research Association and Scottish Educational Research Association
- Ukraine - UERA Ukrainian Educational Researchers Association

== Organisation ==
EERA is governed by Council and the Executive Board].

The executive board is made up of the President, the Treasurer and the Secretary General who are elected for a four-year term:

2022 Executive:

- Joe O'Hara, EERA President
- Maria P. Figueiredo, EERA Secretary General
- Andreas Hadjar, EERA Treasurer
- Petra Grell, Networks Representative on EERA Council

Council consists of the representatives of the member associations and the co-opted Council members – the Networks’ Representative on Council, the editor of EERJ and the Convener of the Emerging Researchers' Group.

=== Networks ===
The academic work of EERA and especially the ECER conference is organised in networks. They are either discipline oriented or focus on certain research themes within educational research.

- 1. Professional Learning and Development
- 2. Vocational Education and Training
- 3. Curriculum
- 4. Inclusive Education
- 5. Children and Youth at Risk and Urban Education
- 6. Open Learning: Media, Environments and Cultures
- 7. Social Justice and Intercultural Education
- 8. Research on Health Education
- 9. Assessment, Evaluation, Testing and Measurement
- 10. Teacher Education Research
- 11. Educational Effectiveness and Quality Assurance
- 12. LISnet - Library and Information Science Network
- 13. Philosophy of Education
- 14. Communities, families, and schooling in educational research
- 15. Research on Partnerships in Education
- 16. ICT in Education and Training
- 17. Histories of Education
- 18. Research in Sport Pedagogy
- 19. Ethnography
- 20. Research in Innovative Intercultural Learning Environments
- 21 Education and Psychoanalysis
- 22. Research in Higher Education
- 23. Policy Studies and Politics of Education
- 24. Mathematics Education Research
- 25. Research on Children's Rights in Education
- 26. Educational Leadership
- 27. Didactics - Learning and Teaching
- 28. Sociologies of Education
- 29. Research on Arts Education
- 30. Research on Environmental and Sustainability Education
- 31. Led – Network on Language and Education
- 32. Organizational Education
- 33 Gender and Education
- Emerging Researchers’ Group (former Postgraduate Network)

== Emerging Researchers’ Group ==
EERA actively promotes the work and professional development of early researchers and PhD students and has therefore established the Emerging Researchers´ Group (ERG).

The Emerging Researchers' Group seeks to:·

- provide a European research community for Emerging Researchers (including those undertaking a Doctorate) ·
- provide a forum for dissemination of Early Career Research at the Emerging Researchers’ Conference.·
- offer support and guidance for article and poster production via the 'Best Paper Award' and 'Best Poster Award'·
- offer support for researchers from Central and Eastern Europe and other low-GDP countries to attend ECER and engage with peers through the bursary program·
- train researchers by offering Season Schools, such as the Summer School on Educational Methodology.
- Moreover, the ERG supports EERA networks in conducting season schools.

=== Best Paper Award ===
Year	Authors	Paper
2015	Panagiota Gkofa	Greek Roma's Educational Pathways: Mapping Factors Leading to Success
2014	Iryna Kushnir	The Role of the Bologna Process in Defining Europe
2013	Cora Lingling Xu’	Identity and Cross-border Student Mobility: The Mainland China-Hong Kong Experience and Its Inverse-directional Parallel European Implications
2012	Triin Lauri	School choice policy – seeking to balance educational efficiency and equity: A comparative analysis of 20 European countries
2011	Anneli Schwartz	Student Responses to a Saviour Pedagogy: An Ethnographic Study
2010	Daniel Fischer	Educational Organisations as "Cultures of Consumption
2009	Konstanze Spohrer	Deconstructing “Aspiration”: UK policy debates and European policy trends
2008	Katrin Kaufmann and Halit Öztürk	Migration background and participation in continuing education in Germany
2007	Nasser Mansour	Religious beliefs: A hidden variable in the performance of science teachers in the classroom
2006	Amanda Cook-Jones	The Changing Role of the Teaching Assistant in the Primary School Sector

== European Conference on Educational Research (ECER) ==
EERA's most visible contribution to the dissemination of educational research is the annual European Conference on Educational Research (ECER).

The first ECER took place in Twente, Netherlands in 1992. Numbers of attendants have grown steadily since then. Usually ECER attracts over 2500 researchers from about 70 different countries.

ECER-Conferences since 1992
Year	Place	Country	Attendees
2022	Yerevan & ECER+ Online	Armenia	
2021	Geneva (Online)	Switzerland	Online
2020	Glasgow	Scotland	Canceled
2019	Hamburg (2nd time)	Germany	
2018	Bolzano	Italy	2,900
2017	Copenhagen (2nd time)	Denmark	
2016	Dublin (2nd time)	Ireland	
2015	Budapest	Hungary	
2014	Porto	Portugal	
2013	Istanbul	Turkey	
2012	Cádiz	Spain	
2011	Berlin	Germany	
2010	Helsinki	Finland	
2009	Vienna	Austria	
2008	Gothenburg	Sweden	
2007	Ghent	Belgium	
2006	Geneva	Switzerland	
2005	Dublin	Ireland	
2004	Crete	Greece	
2003	Hamburg	Germany	
2002	Lisbon	Portugal	
2001	Lille	France	
2000	Edinburgh	Scotland	
1999	Lahti	Finland	
1998	Ljublijana	Slovenia	
1997	Frankfurt/Main	Germany	
1996	Seville	Spain	
1995	Bath	England	
1992	Twente	Netherlands	

== Other activities ==
EERA supports advanced research and training for young researchers and established scholars by funding season schools, projects, seminars, workshops and roundtables of its networks. Since 2009 EERA has run a series of summer schools for emerging researchers.

== European Educational Research Journal (EERJ) ==
The European Educational Research Journal (EERJ) is the official journal of the European Educational Research Association (EERA). It is an international peer-reviewed journal with an editorial board drawn from across Europe and representing leading scholars in the educational field. The EERJ Editor is a member of the EERA Council.

== Book Series - Transdisciplinary Perspectives in Educational Research ==
EERA, in partnership with Springer, publishes a book series focusing on presenting educational research in an innovative, transdisciplinary format. Drawing on extensively on the work of the 33 EERA Networks, the book series seeks to explore issues of importance in educational research in a manner that highlights the potential contribution of distinctive European research approach to the development of the field. The first five titles have been published as of 2022 and cover the following areas:

- Partnerships in Education
- Wellbeing and Schooling
- Children's Rights from International Educational Perspectives
- Gender and Education in Politics, Policy and Practice
- Storied Doctorates

== EERA Blog ==
In 2020 EERA launched the 'EERA Blog' a forum dedicated to disseminating educational research in a more accessible yet still academically rigorous manner. Submissions are invited from across Europe and beyond.

== Partnerships ==
EERA is an active member of a number of international research networks including the WERA (World Education Research Association), ISE (Initiative for Science in Europe) and EASSH (European Alliance for Social Sciences and Humanities)
