= Public Service Broadcasting (band) =

British art rock group

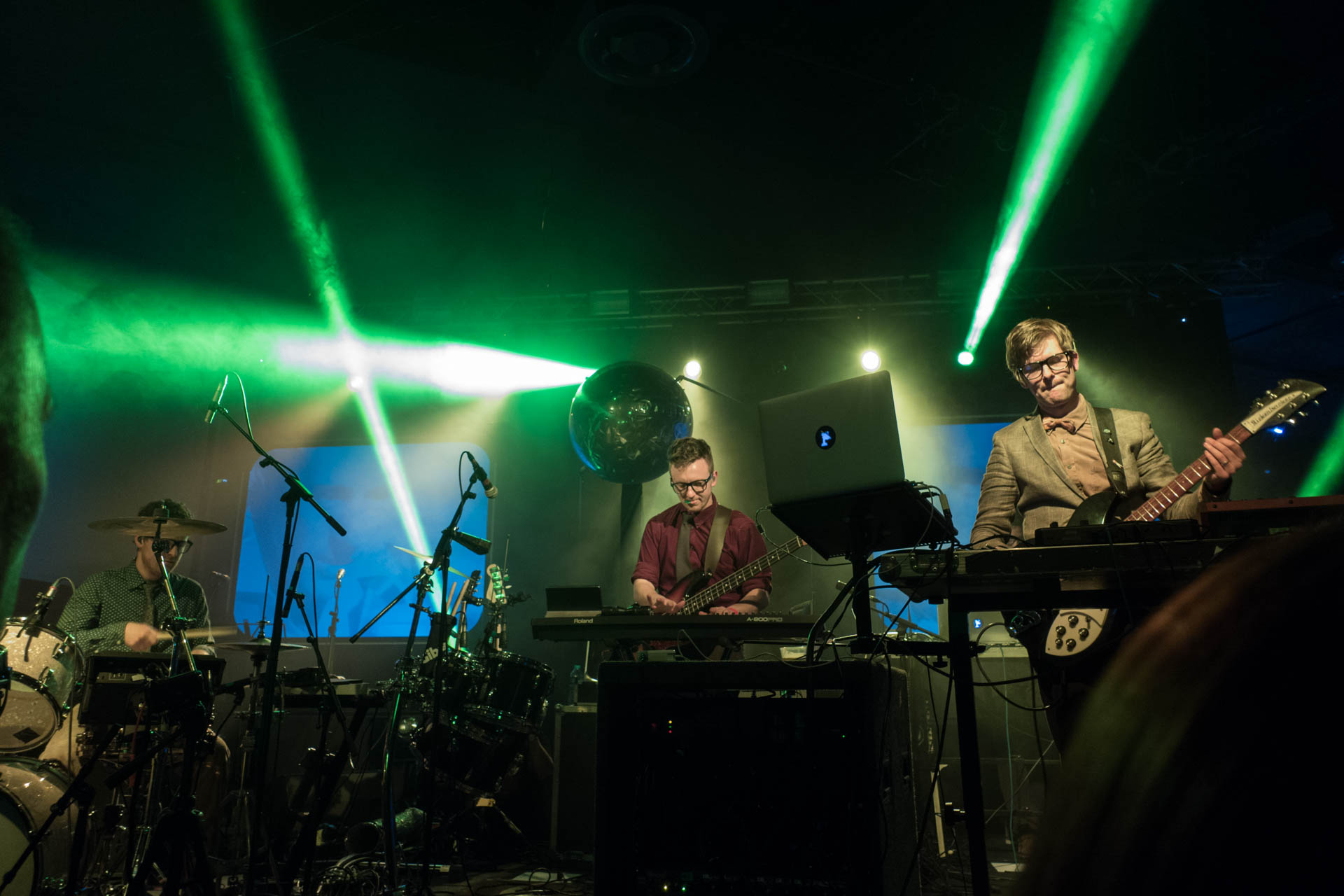
- Public Service Broadcasting performing during the launch event for their The Race for Space Tour in 2015

Background information
- Origin: London, England
- Genres: alternative, art rock, indie rock, electronica, dance-punk, krautrock
- Years active: 2009–present
- Labels: Test Card; Believe; PIAS
- Members: J. Willgoose Esq.; Wrigglesworth; JFAbraham; Mr B
- Website: publicservicebroadcasting.net

Public Service Broadcasting is a British rock band formed in London by J. Willgoose, Esq., in 2010. They consist of four members known mainly by their stage names: Willgoose Esq. (guitar, banjo, strings, samples, and electronics), Wrigglesworth (drums, piano, and electronics), JFAbraham (flugelhorn, bass guitar, drums, and vibraslap) and Mr B (visuals and set design for live performances).

Initially a solo project of J. Willgoose Esq., he released "EP One" in 2009. Shortly thereafter Wrigglesworth joined on drums and the band adopted a conceptual approach, using archival footage from old films and documentaries. They released a second EP The War Room and their first studio album, Inform-Educate-Entertain (2013). They subsequently released The Race for Space in 2015. JFAbraham joined the band officially in 2016, having previously worked as a session musician. The band has since released three albums: Every Valley (2017), Bright Magic (2021) and The Last Flight (2024).

The band has toured internationally and in 2015 was announced as a nominee in the Vanguard breakthrough category of the fourth annual Progressive Music Awards, staged by Prog magazine, which they won.

== History ==
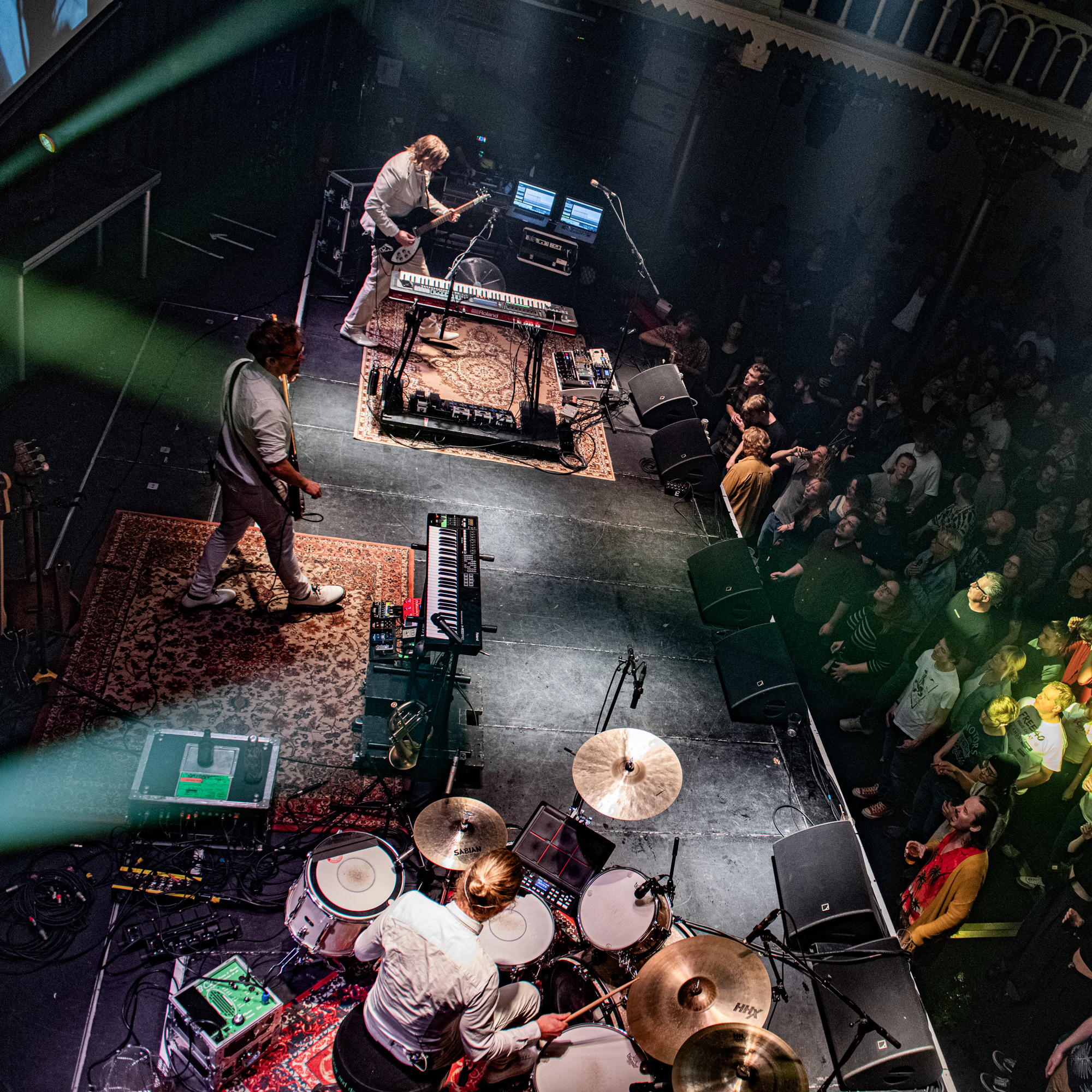
At Paradiso, Amsterdam for the London Calling Festival, October 2022.

Willgoose made his public debut at The Selkirk pub in Tooting, London, England in August 2009. Shortly afterwards he issued "EP One" in 2010. Teaming up with Wrigglesworth on drums, the band played its first festival in September 2010, Aestival in Suffolk, and work began on a second EP, "The War Room", which was released in May 2012.

Since then, the band has released five albums, Inform-Educate-Entertain (2013); The Race for Space (2015); Every Valley (2017); Bright Magic (2021); and The Last Flight (2024). The Race for Space was supported by two shows at the National Space Centre in Leicester celebrating the album's launch. The album charted just outside the top 10 in 11th place in the UK in its release week and reaching Number 1 in the UK Independent Charts for that week. A remix album was released in June 2016.

A follow-up EP was released at the tail end of 2015 entitled Sputnik/Korolev which was backed up by a UK tour that ended at the O2 Academy Brixton. The O2 Academy show was recorded for a live album that was released in 2016.

On 10 March 2017, the band released a new single titled "Progress", featuring vocals from Tracyanne Campbell from Camera Obscura alongside photo shoots showing the band as a three-piece with new member JFAbraham featured in the promotional photos. Their third studio album, entitled Every Valley, about the coal mining industry's rise and fall in the south Wales Valleys between the 1950s and 1980s, was released on 7 July 2017. As with The Race for Space, the band had two album launch concerts, this time in Ebbw Vale, where the LP was recorded.

In May 2018, PSB appeared on BBC 6 Music's contribution to the BBC's Biggest Weekend event at the Titanic Quarter in Belfast. As part of this the band debuted a series of four new pieces, based on the story of the RMS Titanic. These tracks were released as the EP White Star Liner on 26 October 2018.

They performed a "specially commissioned new arrangement" of The Race for Space on 25 July 2019 in a late-night Prom, joined by London Contemporary Voices and the Multi-Story Orchestra, the performance being shown on BBC television the following night.

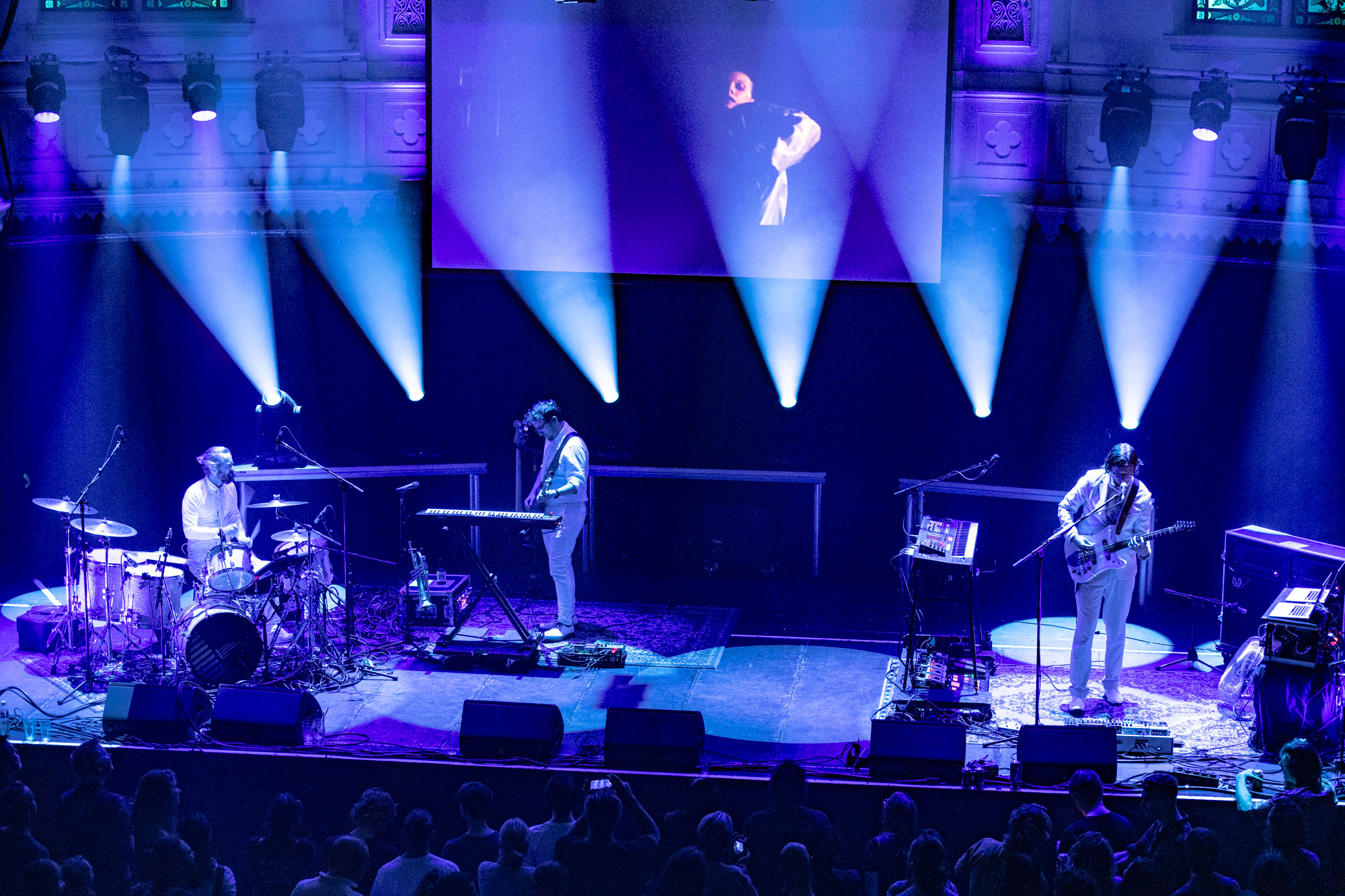
At Paradiso, Amsterdam, October 2022

On 2 June 2021, PSB debuted the first single (titled People, Let’s Dance) from their fourth studio album Bright Magic. In October of that year with a UK tour in support.

On 30 August 2022, PSB played a specially commissioned, album-length piece for Prom 58 called This New Noise, with the BBC Symphony Orchestra at the Royal Albert Hall in London. It was commissioned to celebrate 100 years of the BBC. The band subsequently announced that there would be a record release on 8 September 2023.

The band announced their fifth album, titled The Last Flight, about Amelia Earhart's last flight on which she and her navigator disappeared. Four singles were released prior to the album's release on 4 October 2024. The band followed the release with a tour through Europe.

== Music style and live performances ==
The band mostly plays instrumental music, with J. Willgoose Esq. having said that "singing is never going to work. I'm not going to be happy with it, I'm not going to be comfortable playing it to other people." They take samples from old public information films, archive footage and propaganda material. While writing The War Room the band were given exclusive access to the British Film Institute's archives.

== Members ==
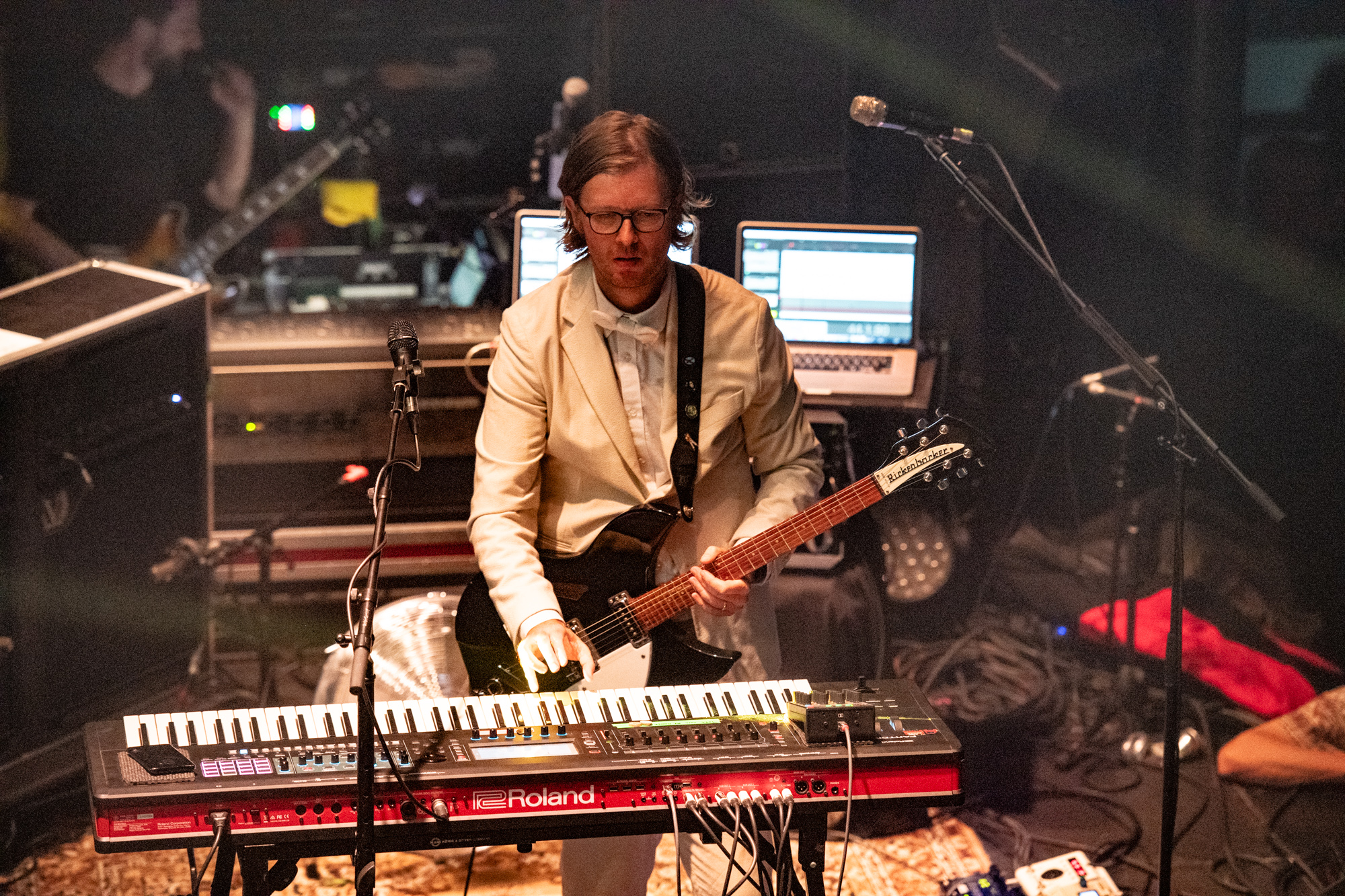
J.Willgoose Esq., Amsterdam, October, 2022

Musical members

- J. Willgoose Esq. – guitar, banjo, bass guitar, other stringed instruments, samplings, keyboards, synthesizers, occasional vocals (2009–present)
- Wrigglesworth – drums, piano, electronic musical instruments, saxophone (2010–present)
- JFAbraham – flugelhorn, bass guitar, drums, assorted other instruments including a vibraslap, keyboards, synthesizers, arrangements (2016–present; session contributions 2014–2015)

Non-musical members

- Mr B – visuals and set design for live performances.

== Instruments and equipment ==
Type	Details
Guitars	Rickenbacker 330; Fender American Vintage 52 Telecaster; Fidelity Stellarosa; Fidelity Double Standard
Amplification	Orangutan 3 Monkeys Amplifier
Synthesisers and digital equipment	Elektron Digitone; Roland Juno-106; Roland Fantom

== Discography ==
Public Service Broadcasting discography
- Studio albums: 5
- Extended plays: 4
- Live albums: 2
- Singles: 22

=== Studio albums ===
Title	Album details	Peak chart positions				Certifications
Title	Album details	UK	IRL	NZ	SCO	Certifications
Inform-Educate-Entertain	Released: 6 May 2013; Labels: Test Card Recordings; Formats: CD, digital download, vinyl	21	—	—	—	BPI: Silver
The Race for Space	Released: 23 February 2015; Label: Test Card Recordings; Formats: CD, digital download, vinyl	11	82	25	—	BPI: Gold
Every Valley	Released: 7 July 2017; Label: Play It Again Sam; Formats: CD, digital download, vinyl	4	83	— (Note: Every Valley did not enter the New Zealand Albums Chart, but peaked at number 2 on the New Zealand Heatseekers Albums Chart.)	3	
Bright Magic	Released: 24 September 2021; Label: Play It Again Sam; Formats: CD, digital download, vinyl	2	53	—	—	
The Last Flight	Release: 4 October 2024; Label: SO Recordings; Formats: CD, digital download, vinyl, cassette	3	—	—	2	
"—" denotes a recording that did not chart or was not released in that territory.

=== Remix albums ===
Title	Album details	Peak chart positions
Title	Album details	UK
The Race for Space / Remixes	Released: 17 June 2016; Labels: Test Card; Formats: CD, digital download	59
Night Flight – The Last Flight Remixes	Released: 10 October 2025; Labels: Silva Screen; Formats: CD, Vinyl, Streaming	—

=== Live albums ===
Title	Album details	Peak chart positions
Title	Album details	UK
Live at Brixton	Released: 2016; Labels: Test Card; Formats: CD, digital download, DVD, vinyl	97
This New Noise	Released: 8 September 2023; Labels: Test Card; Formats: CD, streaming, vinyl	28

=== EPs ===
Title	EP details
EP One	Released: 7 August 2010; Labels: Test Card; Formats: CD, digital download, vinyl
The War Room	Released: 28 May 2012; Label: Test Card; Formats: CD, digital download, vinyl
Signal 30	Released: 15 April 2013; Label: Play It Again Sam; Formats: CD, digital download, vinyl
White Star Liner	Released: 26 October 2018; Label: Play It Again Sam; Formats: CD, digital download, vinyl

=== Singles ===
- "ROYGBIV" – 5 March 2012 which won the BBC Radio 6 Music Rebel Playlist.
- "Spitfire" – 26 March 2012 which won the BBC Radio 6 Music Rebel Playlist. The song sampled dialogue and sound from the 1942 film "The First of the Few", and the video incorporated footage from the same film.
- "London Can Take It" – 13 August 2012
- "Everest" – 12 November 2012 only for digital downloading. The song is based around The Conquest of Everest, a 1953 film charting Sir Edmund Hillary and Tenzing Norgay's first successful ascent of the mountain.
- "Signal 30"
- "Night Mail"
- "Elfstedentocht" (Record Store Day single; 11 November 2013)
- "Gagarin" – 1 December 2014 (first single of the album "The Race for Space")
- "Go!" – 23 February 2015
- "Sputnik/Korolev" – 20 November 2015 (No. 4 UK Physical)
- "Progress" – 10 March 2017 (first single of the band's third album)
- "They Gave Me a Lamp"
- "People Will Always Need Coal"
- "White Star Liner"
- "People, Let's Dance" (featuring Eera)
- "Blue Heaven"
- "Lichtspiel III: Symphonie Diagonale"
- "Der Rhythmus der Maschinen"
- "Broadcasting House" (live)
- "Electra"
- "The South Atlantic" – 2 August 2024
- "The Fun of It"
- "Towards the Dawn"
