= Black Dog in My Path =

Black Dog In My Path

Studio album by Yowler
- Released: 12 October 2018
- Studio: Wherever Audio, Philadelphia
- Length: 38:06
- Label: Double Double Whammy
- Producer: Kyle Gilbride, Maryn Jones

Yowler chronology
The Offer (2015)	Black Dog In My Path (2018)

Singles from Black Dog In My Path
- 1. "WTFK" Released: August 2018; 2. "Angel" Released: September 2018

Black Dog In My Path is the second album by American musician Yowler. It was released on 12 October 2018 on record label Double Double Whammy.

== Background and release ==
Yowler is the stage name of musician Maryn Jones. Jones is lead singer and songwriter of All Dogs, was a bassist and vocalist for Saintseneca, and self-released two solo albums under their own name in 2008 and 2012. In 2015 Jones released The Offer, their debut album as Yowler. Shortly afterwards they moved from Columbus, Ohio to Philadelphia.

Black Dog In My Path was recorded in Philadelphia, with contributions from Jones' friends and label-/bandmates Kyle Gilbride (Swearin'), Matt O'Conke (Saintseneca), Catherine Elicson (All Dogs, Empath), and Michael Cantor (The Goodbye Party). The album was released by Double Double Whammy on 12 October 2018; the tracks "WTFK" and "Angel" were released as singles.

The tracks "Holy Fire" and "No" were written around the same time as Yowler's debut, and "(Holidays Reprise)" is a direct reference to a track from that album. Jones spent two years writing the rest of the album.

The title of the album refers to the folkloric black dog Moddey Dhoo, which Jones came across while reading about their Manx ancestry, and which they described as "a warning and a protection to not go where you shouldn't go, don't go to the sad dark place."

== Themes ==
Jones was raised a mormon, and their decision to leave the church is explored in the lyrics of some tracks, and through their use of religious imagery. The opening line of single "Angel" is a variation of the first line of the hymn Amazing Grace, and Jones told Stereogum that the song is "a celebration of coming to personal realizations and having experiences with people that informed those realizations", and that they intentionally chose it to open the album because it is joyful.

Mental health is also a theme of the album. Jones told Vice that "a lot of the songs on the record are about really hard things, whether it's easy to tell or not." They described the song "Where Is My Light" as being about "going through a period of pretty intense isolation and regret and feeling really hurt by people." Jones also described the dynamics of the album, from love song "Petals" to darker "WTFK" (which Pitchfork said "evokes early Black Sabbath"), as being "reminiscent of the human experience...especially when you're dealing with distress and mental illness."

== Critical reception ==
Professional ratings
Review scores
Source	Rating
ACRN.com (Staff)	6.5/10
New Noise	4/5 stars
Pitchfork	7.6/10
punknews.org (Staff)	3.5/5 stars

Sasha Geffen of Pitchfork rated the album 7.6/10, and described single "Angel" as an "elegant little folk-rock track that unfurls like a poem." Magnet called the album "a must hear."

Cailtin White of Uproxx wrote that compared to their debut, "the sonic textures of Black Dog In My Path are far more expansive."

== Track listing ==
All songs written by Maryn Jones.

No.	Title	Length
1.	"Angel"	03:29
2.	"Holy Fire"	03:45
3.	"Sorrow"	03:56
4.	"Where Is My Light?"	05:30
5.	"Awkward"	02:32
6.	"Aldebaran"	02:32
7.	"WTFK"	02:54
8.	"(Holidays Reprise)"	02:00
9.	"No"	02:59
10.	"Petals"	02:54
11.	"Grizzly Bear II"	02:02
12.	"Spirits & Sprites"	03:27
Total length:		38:06

== Personnel ==
- Maryn Jones – guitar, bass, casio, vocals
- Kyle Gilbride – guitar, bass, synth, keyboard, percussion, vocals
- Matt O'Conke – drums on tracks 1, 2 and 4
- Catherine Elicson – clarinet on tracks 8 and 9, bass on tracks 1 and 11
- Michael Cantor – bowed guitar on track 9, vocals on tracks 1 and 3, cello on track 2

Technical

- Maryn Jones, Kyle Gilbride – production
- Josh Bonati – mastering
- Chelsea Dirck – photography
