= Love Keeps Kicking =

Studio album by Martha
- Released: April 5, 2019
- Recorded: 2018–2019
- Genre: Indie rock; pop punk; indie punk
- Length: 37:07
- Label: Big Scary Monsters (UK/EU); Dirtnap (US)

Martha chronology
Blisters in the Pit of My Heart (2016)	Love Keeps Kicking (2019)	Please Don't Take Me Back (2022)

Love Keeps Kicking is the third studio album by the English band Martha. It was originally released on 5 April 2019 by Big Scary Monsters in the UK/EU and Dirtnap Records in the US.

Professional ratings
Aggregate scores
Source	Rating
Metacritic	80/100
Review scores
Source	Rating
The 405	8/10
AllMusic	3.5/5 stars
Clash	8/10
DIY	4/5 stars
Exclaim!	7/10
The Line of Best Fit	7.5/10
NME	4/5 stars
The Skinny	4/5 stars

== Release ==
Martha released the album's first single, "Heart Is Healing", in December 2018, followed by the album's lead single, "Love Keeps Kicking", in January 2019. The album's third single, "Into This", was released in February 2019.

Around the album's release, the band received profiles from major music and culture magazines Rolling Stone and NME.

The title of "Wrestlemania VIII" references the WWE's signature event Wrestlemania. The title track has a line that refers to someone moshing to the American band Huey Lewis and the News.

"Mini Was A Preteen Arsonist" is named in reference to the Against Me! song "I Was A Teenage Anarchist", and is lyrically based on the true story of Michael ‘Mini’ Cooper as seen in the documentary Mini directed by Franc Roddam.

Tracks "The Void" and "Lucy Shone a Light on You" are both part of a narrative started on "The Ballad of Lucy Connor (Part 1)" — a track from their first EP — with the former being parts of a story written by the titular character that is referenced in the latter.

== Track listing ==
All music is composed by Martha.

No.	Title	Length
1.	"Heart Is Healing"	3:09
2.	"Sight for Sore Eyes"	3:45
3.	"Into This"	3:12
4.	"Wrestlemania VIII"	1:48
5.	"Mini Was a Preteen Arsonist"	3:23
6.	"Love Keeps Kicking"	3:53
7.	"Brutalism by the River (Arrhythmia)"	2:37
8.	"Orange Juice"	4:09
9.	"The Void"	3:12
10.	"Lucy Shone a Light on You"	4:17
11.	"The Only Letter That You Kept"	3:42
Total length:		37:07

== Personnel ==
- J.C. Cairns – vocals, guitar
- Daniel Ellis – vocals, guitar
- Naomi Griffin – vocals, bass
- Nathan Stephens-Griffin – vocals, drums
