= Martha (band) =

English rock band

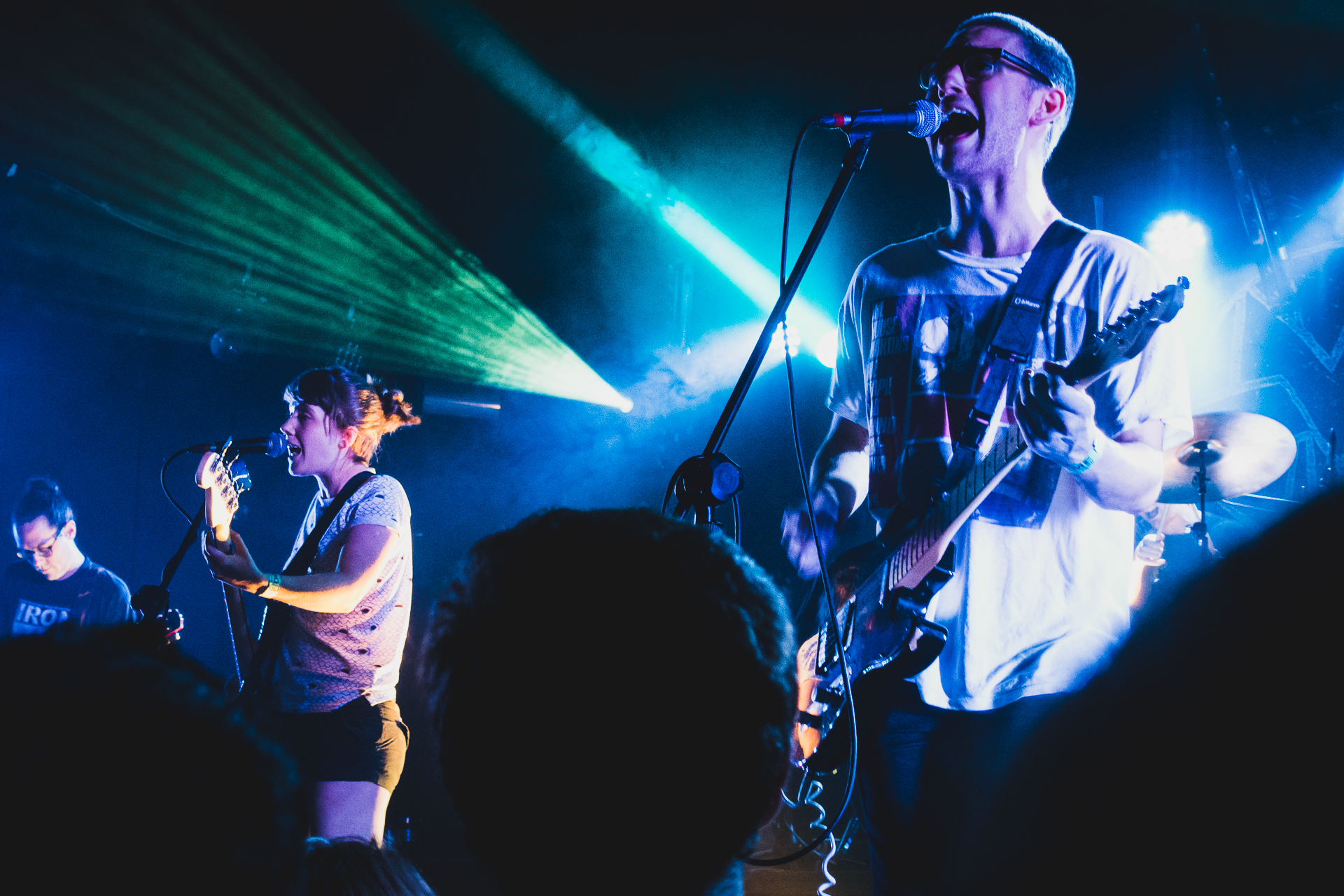
- Martha at the Dome in Tufnell Park, London, in 2016

Background information
- Origin: Pity Me, County Durham, England
- Genres: Indie pop; pop punk; power pop
- Labels: Fortuna Pop!; Odd Box; Discount Horse; Salinas Records; Dirtnap Records; Big Scary Monsters; Specialist Subject Records
- Members: JC Cairns; Daniel Ellis; Naomi Griffin; Nathan Stephens-Griffin
- Website: martha-punx.com

Martha are a rock band from Pity Me, a village in County Durham in the North East of England. After singles on their own Discount Horse label and Odd Box Records, their debut album Courting Strong, was released on Fortuna Pop! and Salinas Records in 2014. As of 2022 they have released four full-length albums on cult UK and US based independent record labels.

They have described themselves as queer, vegan and anarchist - this originally included straight edge, as the band were all sober upon forming, and felt it was a funny thing to include in their description as their sound does not match the usual hardcore of bands that identify that way. The band have said in interviews that they are now no longer all sober. They have no designated frontperson and all contribute vocals. Two members of Martha previously founded (and still play in) the band ONSIND, and another led the band No Ditching. Multiple members of Martha have also played in the group Fortitude Valley.

They have variously cited The Housemartins, Motown, Billy Bragg, The Thermals, Ted Leo, power pop, The Replacements, Heart, The Marked Men, Big Star, Masshysteri, and The Exploding Hearts as influences.

== History ==
Martha formed in the village of Pity Me, a suburb of Durham in the North East of England. Formed by J.C. Cairns (guitar/vocals), Daniel Ellis (guitar/vocals), Naomi Griffin (bass/vocals), and Nathan Stephens-Griffin (drums/vocals) in the early 2010s, they released their self-titled debut EP in February 2012.

A year later they released the "Sycamore"/"Lost Without You" single on their own Discount Horse label. The band played Indietracks festival for the first time in 2013. After releasing a split single with American artist Spoonboy (David Combs of The Max Levine Ensemble) Martha headed to the studio with MJ of Hookworms to record their first album.

Courting Strong was released by Fortuna Pop! in the U.K. and Salinas Records in the U.S. They followed it with more split singles with American bands Benny "The Jet" Rodriguez and Radiator Hospital, a repeat visit to Indietracks and an appearance at Glastonbury Festival.

Their next album Blisters in the Pit of My Heart, also produced by MJ, was issued in mid-2016 by Dirtnap Records in the U.S. and Fortuna Pop! once again in the U.K.

They toured the UK with Radiator Hospital in late 2015, and played a tour of the UK and Ireland with Joyce Manor in July 2017.

In mid to late April and early May 2018 they, along with Bad Moves of Washington, D.C., supported Jeff Rosenstock for the Northeastern and Midwestern leg of his US tour.

On 17 April 2018 Martha, filling in last minute for Yo La Tengo, were the guest band on an episode of The Chris Gethard Show on truTV.

On 13 December 2018 the band released single "Heart Is Healing"; announcing they had signed to Big Scary Monsters in the UK and EU and had a new album following soon. On 28 January 2019 the band unveiled title track "Love Keeps Kicking" as a single. The video for which was the second directed for the band by friends Ben Epstein and David Combs of The Max Levine Ensemble. The band's third album, Love Keeps Kicking, was released on 5 April 2019.

On 28 October 2022 the band released their fourth full-length album Please Don't Take Me Back on Specialist Subject Records in the UK and Dirtnap Records in the US. It was their first album to be released by Specialist Subject, although they had put out a 7" single with them prior. It's also the band's first album to be recorded with Phil Booth at JT Soar in Nottingham, however three tracks from their 2014 split with Spoonboy had been recorded there previously.

In 2023, they went on The Darkest Timeline Disco Tour Part 2 to Hull, Norwich, Birmingham, Sheffield, and Newport. In June 2023, they appeared at the Booze Cruise Festival.

In 2025, they released Standing Where it All Began, a compilation of early singles and rarities released since the formation of the band, and toured the UK alongside Cheekface and Fresh. The compilation album takes its name from a song originally released on their self-titled debut EP, which features as the third song on both the EP and the compilation album.

== Discography ==
=== Albums ===
- Courting Strong – Fortuna Pop! (UK) / Salinas (US), 12" LP, CD, MP3 (2014)
- Blisters in the Pit of My Heart – Fortuna Pop! (UK) / Dirtnap (US), 12" LP, CD, MP3 (2016)
- Love Keeps Kicking – Big Scary Monsters (UK/EU) / Dirtnap (US), 12" LP, CD, MP3 (2019)
- Please Don't Take Me Back – Specialist Subject (UK/EU) / Dirtnap (US), 12" LP, CD, Cassette, MP3 (2022)

=== Compilations ===
- Standing Where It All Began (Singles and B-sides 2012-2025) - Specialist Subject, 12" LP, MP3 (2025)

=== Extended plays ===
- Martha EP – Discount Horse/Win Htein/Odd Box, Cassette, MP3 (2012) and Tuff Enuff reissue, 7", MP3 (2015)

=== Singles ===
- "Sycamore"/"Lost Without You" – Discount Horse, 7", MP3 (2013)
- "The Winter Fuel Allowance Ineligibility Blues"/"Fix My Brain" (The Marked Men cover) - Fortuna Pop!, 7", MP3 (2017)
- "Heart is Healing" – Big Scary Monsters (UK/EU) / Dirtnap (US), MP3 (2018)
- "Love Keeps Kicking" – Big Scary Monsters (UK/EU) / Dirtnap (US), MP3 (2019)
- "Into This" – Big Scary Monsters (UK/EU) / Dirtnap (US), MP3 (2019)
- "Please Don't Take Me Back"/"My Heart is a Drummer" (Allo Darlin' cover) – Specialist Subject, 7", MP3 (2022)
- "Beat Perpetual"/"Dreaming Out Loud" (Tenement cover) - Dirtnap, 7", MP3 (2022)
- "Hope Gets Harder" - Specialist Subject/Dirtnap, MP3 (2022)
- "A Praise Chorus"/"Crush" (Jimmy Eat World covers) - Big Scary Monsters, 7", MP3 (2024)

=== Split releases ===
- Split EP with Spoonboy – Nervous Nelly, 7", MP3 (2014)
- Split EP with Radiator Hospital – Specialist Subject, 7", MP3 (2015)
- Split EP with Benny the Jet Rodriguez – Drunken Sailor, 7", MP3 (2015)
