= King Louie Bankston =

American musician (1973–2022)

- Born: Louis Paul Bankston; December 18, 1972; Harahan, Louisiana, U.S.
- Origin: New Orleans
- Died: February 12, 2022 (aged 49)
- Genres: Garage punk; garage rock; punk rock; bubblegum; swamp pop; boogie rock; blues rock; rock and roll; power pop
- Occupation: Musician
- Instruments: Vocals; guitar; bass guitar; keyboards; percussion
- Years active: 1987–2022
- Labels: Goner; Sympathy for the Record; Dirtnap; Empty

Louis Paul Bankston (December 18, 1972 – February 12, 2022), better known as King Louie, was an American rock and roll musician from New Orleans. Associated early on with garage rock, he abandoned the genre in 1998 and focused on Louisiana swamp pop, boogie woogie, boogie rock, and power pop. He was best known for his work in the Royal Pendletons, The Persuaders, The Exploding Hearts, and The King Louie One Man Band. Bankston toured Europe and the United States, since the early 1990s. He released 53 records in the vinyl format. Bankston later played music based out of Oakland, California. He lived in New Orleans, Portland, Oregon, and Memphis, Tennessee.

== History ==
=== Royal Pendletons ===
King Louie helped found the Royal Pendletons in 1991 along with Michael Hurtt on guitar/vocals, J. Matthew Uhlman on guitar/vocals, and G. Thomas Oliver on organ. The band achieved in the pre-internet years what is now known as a " Buzz Band " status today. Not concentrating on the studio or recording side of their set the band has little to show for their efforts. The RP's were known to have over 100 songs and usually played from open to close at New Orleans venues Checkpoint Charlie's, Benny's and Barristers (Memphis). The Royal Pendletons put out their first 7-inch on Goner Records in 1995, and in 1998 put out a full-length LP on Sympathy for the Record Industry with producer Alex Chilton entitled Oh Yeah, Baby.

=== Terry and Louie ===
Terry and Louie is a return to Louie's Exploding Hearts writing and playing with bandmate Terry. After over a decade of no communication the two had reformed and were making records and touring throughout the year. The band has been active since 2013. They are on the Tuff Break record roster and were based out of Oakland. It was Louis' only project of new music.

=== The Persuaders ===
King Louie Bankston formed the garage rock band, The Persuaders in 1996, along with Jason Panzer on guitar, and Shaggy on drums. In The Persuaders, Louie and Jason Panzer both sang and played Gibson Flying V guitars and were the first to use them visually with the crossed aerial logo.

=== Bad Times ===
Bad Times were a one-off band which also included Eric Oblivian and Jay Reatard. The band recorded an album's worth of material after only one practice session in 1998, releasing a self-titled LP in 2001. the members returned to their respective solo commitments. Eric and Louie have been positive about trying to re-issue the out-of-print LP.

=== The Exploding Hearts ===
In 2000, Louie moved to Portland, Oregon. In 2001 he joined The Exploding Hearts, where he co-wrote and played keyboards on their only LP, Guitar Romantic. After 11 months with the group, Louie declined to move into a management/lead role. Plans were in the works to continue as a writer only, while the band continued to play as a four-piece. After a show in San Francisco, the band's van overturned on the way home in the early hours of July 20, 2003. Three members of the group were killed, thus precluding any future work together.

=== King Louie and the Loose Diamonds ===
Formed in 2003 as Rat Tail, in 2007, Empty Records released Memphis Treet by King Louie and the Loose Diamonds. The Loose Diamonds are: King Louie Bankston (until 2022), Jack Oblivian (of the Oblivians, The Cool Jerks, and the Tennessee Tearjerkers), Harlan T. Bobo (Viva L'American Deathray Music), Adam Woodard (Tennessee Tearjerkers), and Chad Booth (Kajun SS). In 2009 Julian Fried joined as guitar player.

=== The King Louie One Man Band ===
King Louie started his One Man Band in 1999. In the King Louie One Man Band, Louie sang, played drums, guitar, cowbell, and harmonica. The King Louie One Man Band has released several 7-inch records on various labels, and put out a full-length LP on Goner in 2004.

=== King Louie's Missing Monuments ===
In 2009, King Louie along with longtime friend and collaborator, revered lead guitarist Julien Fried formerly of Seattle, recruited drummer Aaron Hill and bassist Bennette Bartley to form the power pop group King Louie's Missing Monuments. Benny Divine (Wizzard Sleeve) later joined the band after Bartley's departure and the band changed their name to The Missing Monuments. Devine left the band and was replaced by Gary Mader (Eyehategod). They have released two LP's and 4 singles/E.P.'s. They have toured the US and Europe. In February 2016 the band once again for the third time changed the name to reflect the latest lineup and ever changing sound to King Louie and The Missing Monuments. A new album BADFINDER is forthcoming with no set completion or release date.

== Other bands ==
King Louie Bankston has played in a number of bands in the past 20 years. These bands include the Intelligenitals (1987), The Lame Ones (1988) The Clickems (1990–1991), Dirt Boys/Harahan Crack Combo (1991–1992) Gerry and the bastard Makers (1992–1994), Royal Pendletons (1991-1999/2003–2022), Christies Paddad Toilet Seat (1992), Sun of the Caesar (1994), Funny Boys (1995), The Persuaders (1996–1999), Bad Times (1998), Head Wounds (1999), King Louie One Man Band (1999–2022), 10-4 Backdoor (2000–2003), The Exploding Hearts (2002–2003), King Louie and the Loose Diamonds (2003–2022), Hot Dog (2004), Kajun SS (2004–2005), Kondor (2003–2022), Black Rose Band (2005–2022), Lonely Knights (2007–2022), Bipolaroid (2009-2013), Terry & Louie (2014-2022).

== Death ==
Bankston died on February 12, 2022, aged 49. He was interred at Metairie Cemetery.

== Full discography ==
(1) King Louie the 69th & The Harahan Crack Combo "Little Girl"//"Jailbait" 7-inch single RECORDED 1992 (Goner Records, 1993)

(2) Royal Pendletons "Smokin'"/"Sheep Suit"//"Losing Hand"/"Royal Blood, pt. II" 7-inch e.p. (Goner Records, 1994)

(3) Royal Pendletons "Guitar Crusher" split 7-inch single w/ Krontjong Devils (Knobbler Records, 1996)

(4) Royal Pendletons "Hot Rod Dissertation" on the Splitsville Confidential comp. 7-inch e.p. (Splitsville Records, 1997)

(5) Royal Pendletons "No Teasin' Round"/"(I'm a) Sore Loser" on the Sore Losers soundtrack 2×LP (Sympathy, 1997)

(6) Persuaders Rock Bottom 4-song 7-inch e.p. (Splitsville Records, 1997)

(7) Oblivians [guest vocals] "King Louie Stomp" split 7-inch single w/ Two Bo's Maniacs (Hate Records, 1997)

(8) Royal Pendletons "You Can Always Love Again"/"Keg Tapper"//"Hangin' on a String"/"Game of Love" 7-inch e.p. (Blood Red, 1997)

(9) Royal Pendletons "Boo's Bash" on the Hot Rods to Hell II comp. LP (Blood Red, 1997)

(10) Royal Pendletons // King Louie & The Lakeview Vikings "I Wanna Know"//"Mistreated" on the Blood Red Battle Royale comp. LP (Blood Red, 1998)

(11) Royal Pendletons "(I'm a) Sore Loser"//"Boo's Bash" 7-inch single (Sympathy for the Record Industry, 1998)

(12) Royal Pendletons Oh Yeah, Baby 14-song LP (Sympathy for the Record Industry, 1998)

(13) Royal Pendletons // Persuaders "King Bee"//"Revenge" on the Shine On, Sweet Starlet soundtrack LP (Sympathy, 1998)

(14) Persuaders "Van Ride"//"Dixie Buzzards"/"I'm a Fool" 7-inch e.p. (Royal Records, 1998)

(15) Persuaders Persuaders 17-song LP (Savage Records, 1999)

(16) King Louie One Man Band "She's a Big Big Bopper"/"One Man"//"Love Love Love" 7-inch e.p. (Solid Sex Lovie Doll, 2000)

(17) King Louie One Man Band "Walkin' and a' Steppin' in the Fire"//"Walkin' with the Light" 7-inch single (Therapeutic Records, 2000)

(18) Bad Times Bad Times 14-song LP (Goner/Therapeutic Records, 2001)

(19) King Louie One Man Band King Louie One Man Band 14-song LP (Kryptonite/Savage Records, 2001/2002)

(20) Exploding Hearts Guitar Romantic 11-song LP (Screaming Apple Records, 2002)

(21) Persuaders "See My Reason"/"Fuck You, Mr. Roboto" split 7-inch e.p. w/ The Blacks (Rockin' Bones, 2003)

(22) 10-4 Backdoor "I Fucked a Prostitute"/"Hot Box"//"Kick the Door Down"/"Bad Life" 7-inch e.p. (Solid Sex Lovie Doll, 2004)

(23) King Louie One Man Band Chinese Crawfish 16-song LP (Goner Records, 2004)

(24) Kajun SS Kajun SS a.k.a. Wop Bop Bam Bam 7-song, 1-sided 12-inch e.p. (Jeth-Row/Therapeutic Records, 2004)

(25) Kajun SS "German Kajun"//"Automobile" 7-inch single (Die Slaughterhaus/Shattered Records, 2004/2005)

(26) King Louie & The Loose Diamonds Memphis Treet 12-song LP (Empty Records, 2007)

(27) Black Rose Band "Hot Box"//"Hoochie Poochie" 7-inch single (Contaminated Records, 2007)

(28) Kajun SS Jazz Legends 7-inch single (Jeth-Row Records, 2007)

(29) Exploding Hearts Shattered LP (Dirtnap Records, 2007)

(30) Royal Pendletons "Double Shot of My Baby's Love"//"What a Way to Die" 7-inch single (Allons Records, 2008)

(31) Royal Pendletons Nites Along the Mississippi 14-song LP (Allons Records, 2008)

(32) Royal Pendletons "Tell Me" split 7-inch single w/ The Bo-Keys (Norton Records, 2008)

(33) Guitar Lightnin' Lee & His Thunder Band [harmonica] Call Up the Band 2×7″ e.p. (Die Slaughterhaus, 2009)

(34) Missing Monuments "Black Rainbow"//"Tailspin" 7-inch single (Douchemaster Records, 2010)

(35) Brick War "Bonetrail"//"Silverado Sixpack"//"Deviled Oyster"//"Lonesome Shoes" 2×7″ e.p. (Savage Records, 2010)

(36) BIPOLAROID "ILLUSION FIELDS" 10 song LP 2010 self-released/non label affiliation

(37) MISSING MONUMENTS "PAINTED WHITE" lp 2011 Douchemaster Records

(38) MISSING MONUMENTS "I'm Gonna Love You Back To Life" // "Bleed" // "Another Girl" 7" e.p. ( Hozac Records, 2012 )

(39) KONDOR "Tombstone Barstool" // "Girl In The Holler" ( Loosey Goosey Records, 2012 )

(40) QUINTRON & MISS PUSSYCAT " Live at Third Man Records 3-31-2012 " LIVE lp / Guest harmonica appearance (third man records)

(41) CYCLOPS "Eye Can't Take It" EP: guest guitar and harmonica / (BATCHELOR Records)

(42) MISSING MONUMENTS "BLAST!" EP / BLAST! / GHOST HIGHWAY / COVERED IN ICE / (SLOVENLY Records)

(43) MISSING MONUMENTS S/T LP (DIRTNAP Records)

(44) BILPOAROID "TWIN LANGUAGE" lp (GET HIP Records)

(45) BIPOLAROID 7-inch 45 / SUPERNATURAL BEAUTY / BEAUTIFUL (IN THE MORNING) / (GET HIP Records)
