= Swearin' (album) =

Studio album by Swearin'
- Released: June 1, 2012
- Genre: Pop-punk; indie rock
- Label: Salinas Records

Swearin' chronology
| Swearin' (2012) | Surfing Strange (2013) |

Professional ratings
Review scores
| Source | Rating |
|---|---|
| Robert Christgau | (2-star Honorable Mention) |
| Pitchfork Media | 7.8/10 |
| Punknews.org | 4/5 stars |

Swearin' is the debut album by the band of the same name, originally released on June 1, 2012, on vinyl, and re-released four months later, in October, on compact disk. The New York Times' Jon Caramanica described the album as "hops among various stripes of punk and ’90s indie rock." He also said that on the album, "There are heavy echoes of riot grrrl, especially on “Shrinking Violet,” on which Allison is ferocious: “Your idea of a good time/is my idea of a violent crime.”"

== Track listing ==
| No. | Title | Length |
|---|---|---|
| 1. | "1" | 01:04 |
| 2. | "Here to Hear" | 02:42 |
| 3. | "Kenosha" | 02:42 |
| 4. | "Fat Chance" | 02:24 |
| 5. | "Shrinking Violet" | 02:08 |
| 6. | "Divine / Mimosa" | 02:37 |
| 7. | "Hundreds & Thousands" | 02:29 |
| 8. | "Just" | 02:25 |
| 9. | "Crashing" | 01:41 |
| 10. | "Kill 'em with Kindness" | 01:31 |
| 11. | "Empty Head" | 02:30 |
| 12. | "Movie Star" | 03:38 |
