= On the Outside =

On the Outside may refer to:

== Albums ==
- On the Outside (The Marked Men album) or the title song, 2004
- On the Outside (Starsailor album), 2005
- On the Outside, by Symposium, 1998

== Songs ==
- "On the Outside", by No Use for a Name from Making Friends, 1997
- "On the Outside", by Oingo Boingo from Only a Lad, 1981
- "On the Outside", by Sheryl Crow from Songs in the Key of X: Music from and Inspired by the X-Files, 1996
- "On the Outside (Justin's Song)", by Kilo Kish from American Gurl, 2022
