= Ghosts (The Marked Men album) =

Studio album by The Marked Men
- Released: January 27, 2009
- Genre: Punk rock
- Length: 30:17
- Label: Dirtnap
- Producer: The Marked Men

The Marked Men chronology
Fix My Brain (2006)	Ghosts (2009)

Professional ratings
Review scores
Source	Rating
Alternative Press	4/5 stars
Punknews.org	4/5 stars

Ghosts is the fourth studio album by the Denton, Texas punk rock band The Marked Men, released January 27, 2009 by Dirtnap Records. Like their previous albums, the band recorded, produced, and mixed it themselves in a converted shed in their hometown of Denton.

The album received positive reviews from critics, with most noting that its speed and the brevity of most of the songs necessitated repeat listens to notice its more intricate qualities. Bryne Yancey of Punknews.org remarked that "there's so much going on underneath the surface of these songs that once all the intricacies hit your ears, it might cause you to wonder aloud if anyone else who's not in the band notices them. Sure, anyone can listen to the Marked Men, but to hear them is a completely different experience." Luke Jackson of Alternative Press noted "To be perfectly honest, Ghosts won't grab you at first. Sure, they're a band playing loud, fast, and exceptionally tight, but the pop-punk market has been so oversaturated that it takes a lot for a band like Marked Men to be anything but white noise. However, once you hit your fourth or fifth listen, the hooks will finally start to sink in."

== Track listing ==
- All songs written by The Marked Men
1. "All in Your Head" – 2:13
2. "Ditch" – 1:51
3. "Fortune" – 1:57
4. "My Love" – 1:56
5. "I Must Be Dead" – 1:55
6. "Head Set" – 1:35
7. "Locked Up" – 1:16
8. "Not That Kid" – 1:54
9. "Stay Away" – 1:52
10. "Get to You" – 2:14
11. "Ghosts" – 2:26
12. "Shaky Ground" – 1:28
13. "Red Light Rumors" – 2:06
14. "One More Time" – 2:44
15. "Blew My Head" – 2:57

== Personnel ==
- Jeff Burke – guitar, lead vocals
- Mark Ryan – guitar, lead vocals, cover design
- Joe Ayoub – bass guitar
- Mike Throneberry – drum kit, backing vocals
- Alan Douches – mastering
- Alex Zavaleta – cover photo
- Recorded by The Marked Men
