= The Marked Men (album) =

Studio album by The Marked Men
- Released: May 20, 2003
- Genre: Punk rock
- Label: Rip Off; Dirtnap
- Producer: The Marked Men

The Marked Men chronology
The Marked Men (2003)	On the Outside (2004)

Professional ratings
Review scores
Source	Rating
AllMusic	4/5 stars

The Marked Men is the debut album by the Denton, Texas punk rock band The Marked Men, released May 20, 2003 by Rip Off Records and Dirtnap Records.

== Track listing ==
No.	Title	Writer(s)	Length
1.	"We Won't Talk About It"	Jeff Burke	1:28
2.	"What Can I Say"	Mark Ryan	2:08
3.	"Not Too Late"	Burke	1:27
4.	"Waste of Space"	Ryan	1:49
5.	"Destroy Them"	Burke	2:05
6.	"Not Just Another Girl"	Ryan	2:05
7.	"Hate Me Anyway"	Ryan	2:06
8.	"Backlash"	Ryan	1:49
9.	"I Don't Want It"	Burke	1:24
10.	"My Eyes Fail Me"	Burke	2:14
11.	"That Kid"	Ryan	2:19
12.	"Nowhere"	Burke	1:46
13.	"It's Wasted"	Burke	1:27

== Personnel ==
- Jeff Burke – guitar, lead vocals
- Mark Ryan – guitar, lead vocals
- Joe Ayoub – bass guitar
- Mike Throneberry – drum kit
- Jim Kuckowski – mastering
- Mark Ryan and Dana Harper – photos and cover design
- Recorded and mixed by The Marked Men
