= Tourist in This Town =

Tourist In This Town

Studio album by Allison Crutchfield
- Released: January 27, 2017
- Genre: Synthpop, pop rock, indie rock
- Length: 32:31
- Label: Merge Records
- Producer: Jeff Zeigler

Tourist in This Town is the debut solo album by Allison Crutchfield, a former member and co-founder of the bands P.S. Eliot and Swearin'. It was released on January 27, 2017 on Merge Records, and produced by Jeff Zeigler.

== Critical reception ==
Professional ratings
Aggregate scores
Source	Rating
Metacritic	82/100
Review scores
Source	Rating
AllMusic	4/5 stars
The A.V. Club	B+
The Guardian	4/5 stars
Irish Times	4/5 stars
The Observer	4/5 stars
Pitchfork	7.8/10
The Skinny	4/5 stars
Vice (Expert Witness)	(2-star Honorable Mention)

Tourist in This Town received mostly favorable reviews from music critics; according to review aggregator website Metacritic, it has a score of 82 out of 100, indicating "universal acclaim" from critics. One of these favorable reviews was written by Pitchfork's Jazz Monroe, who gave the album a score of 7.8 out of 10, writing that it "channels the kind of late-80s synth pop that jettisoned style in favor of vastness and grace—skyline synths pirouette, vocals implore, pensive guitars sporadically erupt."

== Track listing ==
1. Broad Daylight – 3:30
2. I Don’t Ever Wanna Leave California – 2:24
3. Charlie – 2:30
4. Dean’s Room – 4:16
5. Sightseeing – 4:38
6. Expatriate – 2:30
7. Mile Away – 3:57
8. The Marriage – 0:55
9. Secret Lives and Deaths – 3:20
10. Chopsticks on Pots and Pans – 4:28

== Personnel ==
- Sam Cook-Parrott – bass, guitar, vocals
- Allison Crutchfield – arranger, guitar, piano, primary artist, producer, synthesizer, vocals
- Katie Crutchfield – vocals
- Joey Doubek – drums, percussion
- Maggie Fost – design
- Maria Rice – assistant mastering engineer
- Jesse Riggins – photography
- Jeff Zeigler – drum programming, engineer, mastering, producer, synthesizer
