= Blisters in the Pit of My Heart =

Studio album by Martha
- Released: 1 July 2016
- Studio: Suburban Home
- Length: 36:23
- Label: Fortuna Pop! (UK); Dirtnap Records (US)
- Producer: Matthew 'MJ' Johnson

Martha chronology
Courting Strong (2014)	Blisters in the Pit of My Heart (2016)	Love Keeps Kicking (2019)

Professional ratings
Aggregate scores
Source	Rating
Metacritic	79/100
Review scores
Source	Rating
AllMusic	4/5 stars
Clash	9/10
Consequence of Sound	B+
DIY	4/5 stars
Drowned in Sound	9/10
Pitchfork	7.3/10.0
The Skinny	3/5 stars

Blisters in the Pit of My Heart is the second studio album by English band Martha. It was released in July 2016 by Fortuna Pop! in the UK/EU and Dirtnap Records in the US.

According to Pitchfork, the album's lead single "Goldman's Detective Agency," "reimagines early 20th century anarchist Emma Goldman as a private investigator'.

In Ice Cream And Sunscreen the line "December boy you got it wrong" is a reference to the refrain of "September Gurls" by Big Star, "December boy's got it bad".

Curly & Raquel references two characters from the British soap opera Coronation Street as well as paraphrasing lyrics from a Billy Bragg song.

St Paul’s (Westerberg Comprehensive) is about 'queer students at catholic school' and the title of which references both Paul Westerberg and the film Heathers. The lyrics also reference Bastards of Young, a song by Westerberg's band The Replacements.

== Accolades ==
Publication	Accolade	Year	Rank	Ref.
The A.V. Club	The A.V. Club's Top 50 Albums of 2016	2016	20	
Consequence of Sound	Top 50 Albums of 2016	2016	46	
Rough Trade	Albums of the Year	2016	54	
Panorama (nettavis)	Albums of the Year	2016	10	

== Track listing ==
All music is composed by Martha.

No.	Title	Length
1.	"Christine"	1:57
2.	"Chekhov's Hangnail"	2:57
3.	"Precarious (Supermarket Song)"	2:59
4.	"Do Whatever"	2:45
5.	"Goldman's Detective Agency"	3:33
6.	"The Awkward Ones"	3:17
7.	"Ice Cream And Sunscreen"	2:08
8.	"11:45, Legless In Brandon"	3:07
9.	"Curly & Raquel"	4:08
10.	"Do Nothing"	6:58
11.	"St. Paul's (Westerberg Comprehensive)"	2:34
Total length:		36:23
