= Surfing Strange =

Studio album by Swearin'
- Released: November 5, 2013
- Genre: Indie rock, punk
- Label: Salinas Records

Swearin' chronology
Swearin' (2012)	Surfing Strange (2013)	Fall Into the Sun (2018)

Professional ratings
Aggregate scores
Source	Rating
Metacritic	74/100
Review scores
Source	Rating
Allmusic	4/5 stars
Consequence of Sound	C+
NME	8/10
Pitchfork Media	7.6/10
Robert Christgau	(1-star Honorable Mention)
Rolling Stone	3.5/5 stars
Spin	8/10

Surfing Strange is the second full-length album by Swearin'. It was released on November 5, 2013, on Salinas Records. Unlike the band's 2012 debut album, it features vocals from the band's bassist Keith Spencer.

== Track listing ==
No.	Title	Length
1.	"Dust in the Gold Sack"	03:08
2.	"Watered Down"	02:53
3.	"Mermaid"	04:16
4.	"Parts of Speech"	03:01
5.	"Melanoma"	03:20
6.	"Echo Locate"	03:15
7.	"Loretta's Flowers"	03:10
8.	"Glare of the Sun"	03:23
9.	"Unwanted Place"	02:28
10.	"Young"	02:01
11.	"Curdled"	02:33
