= Kylie V =

Canadian singer-songwriter

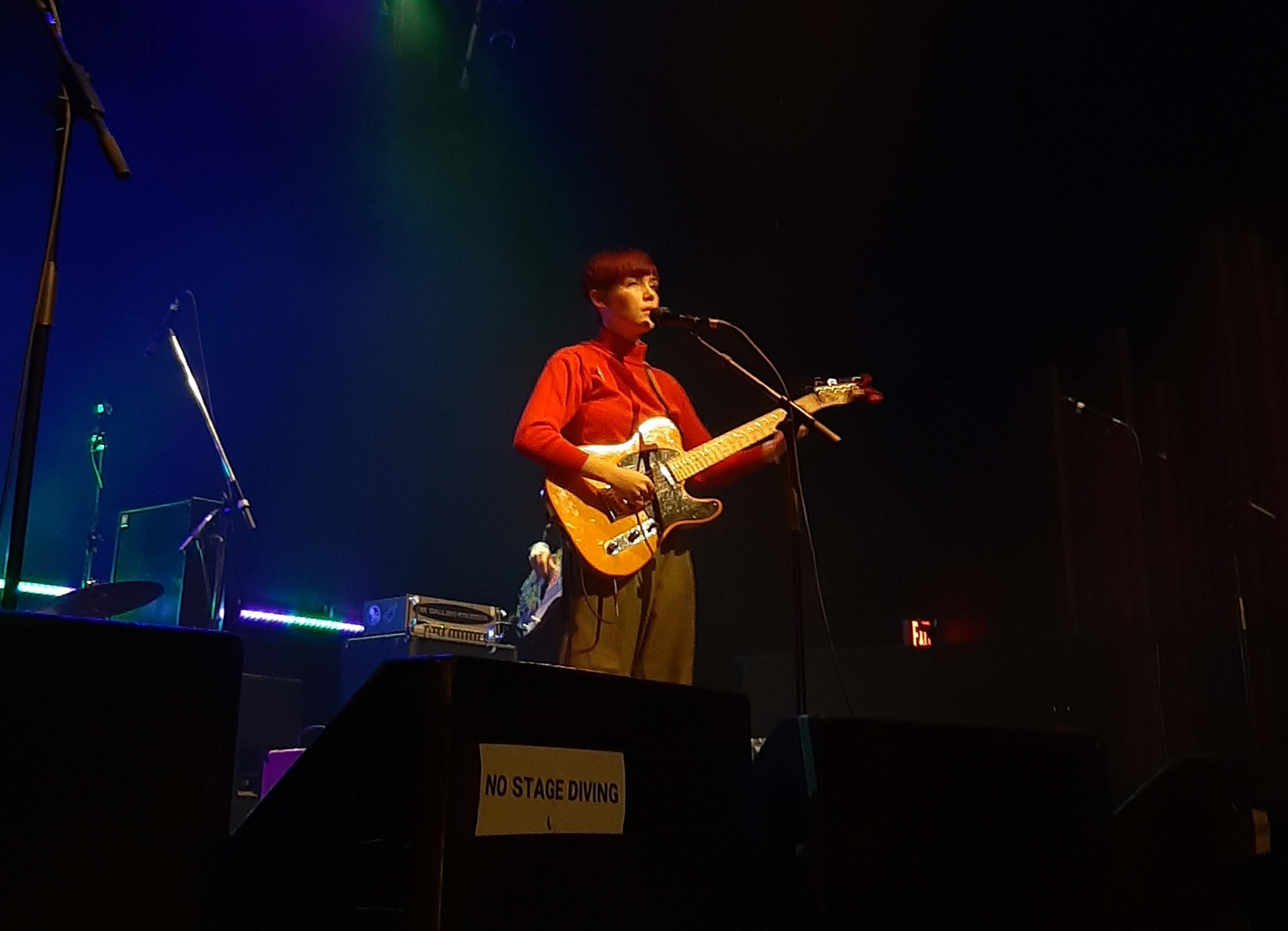
- Kylie V performing in Vancouver in 2019

Background information
- Born: Kylie Van Slyke; January 23, 2004 (age 22); Vancouver, British Columbia
- Genres: Alternative rock; indie rock; dream pop
- Occupations: Singer-songwriter, musician
- Years active: 2018–present
- Website: https://kylievmusic.com/

Kylie V is a Canadian singer-songwriter based in Vancouver, British Columbia. Born Kylie Van Slyke, they debuted with their EP Lotus Eater in December 2018. Their first full-length album Big Blue was released in February 2021. Their second full-length album Crash Test Plane was released November 15, 2024 by Royal Mountain Records. They have since performed with acts such as Men I Trust, quinnie, Mal Blum, Peach Pit, and Peach Kelli Pop.

Van Slyke began playing guitar at age thirteen, inspired by fellow Vancouver indie rock musicians Peach Pit. They were raised in a musical family, their mother being a singer, father a drummer, maternal grandfather a drummer and drum maker, and paternal grandfather a trumpeter. Van Slyke has also cited artists such as Phoebe Bridgers, Big Thief, Snail Mail, Crywank, Christian Lee Hutson, and Neutral Milk Hotel as influences on their work.

== Personal life ==
Van Slyke is non-binary and has openly discussed being diagnosed with autism, as well as their struggles with depression and anxiety.

== Discography ==
- lotus eater EP (2018)
- Big Blue (2021)
- Runaway EP (2023)
- Anomaly (single) (2023)
- Crash Test Plane (2024)
