= Radiator Hospital =

American indie rock band

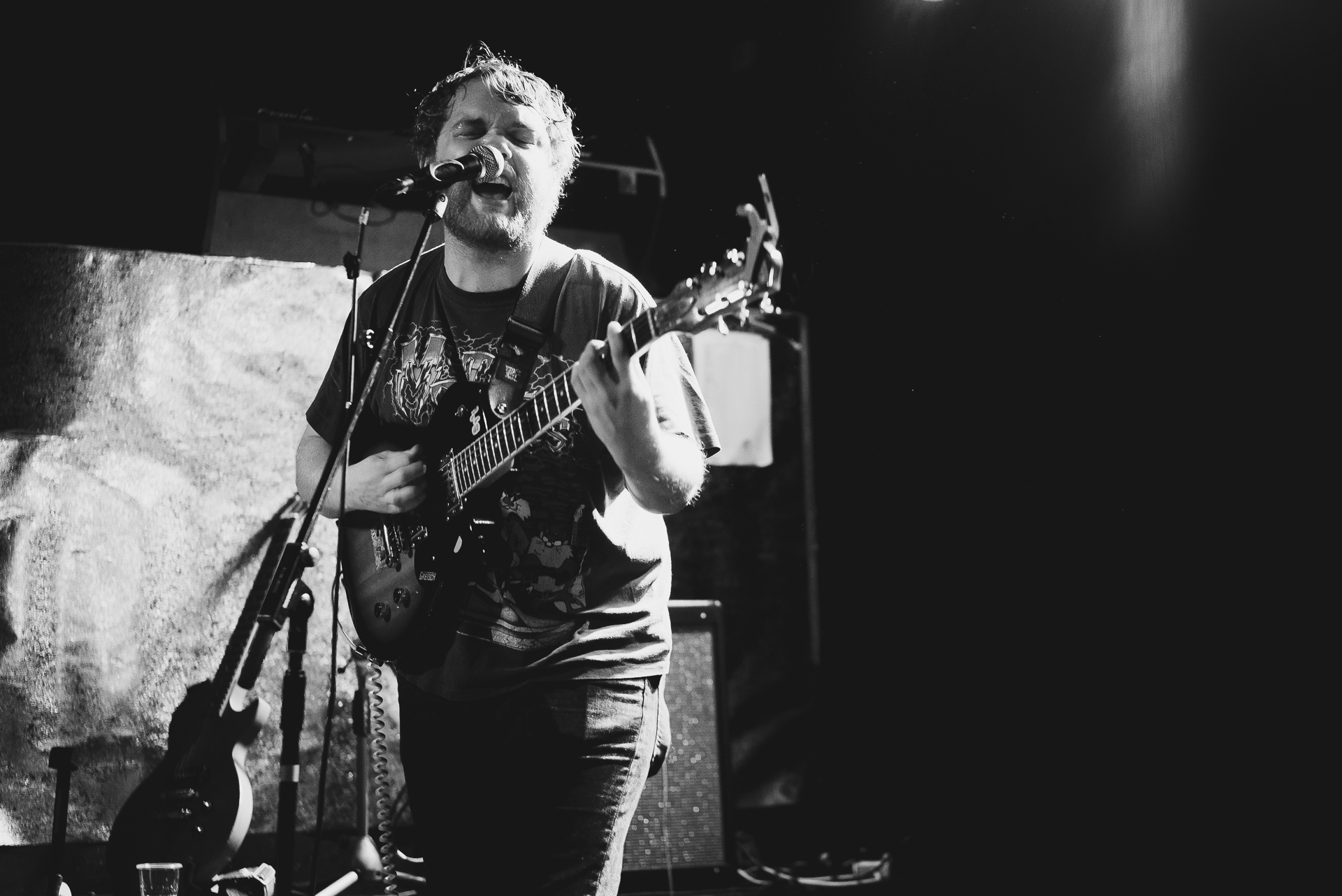
- Radiator Hospital performing in 2017

Background information
- Origin: Grand Rapids, Michigan
- Genres: Indie rock, indie pop, emo revival
- Label: Salinas Records
- Members: Sam Cook-Parrott; Cynthia Schemmer; Jon Rybicki; Jeff Bolt

Radiator Hospital is an American indie rock band. Though songwriter Sam Cook-Parrott (vocals/guitar) is from Grand Rapids, Michigan, they are now based in Philadelphia. The rest of the current lineup is Cynthia Schemmer (guitar/vocals), Jon Rybicki (bass), and Jeff Bolt (drums). They have released six albums; two out of print lo-fi cassettes, and four LPs put out by Salinas Records.

== History ==
After Sam Cook-Parrott's high school band, Cookie Bumstead & The Lonesome Space Cadets, ended, he started recording solo material with a four-track tape recorder. He named the project after an auto body shop in Grand Rapids. Radiator Hospital released their first full-length album in 2010 titled My Most Imaginary Friend.

In September 2012, after a few years of regional shows and some minimal touring, Cook-Parrott relocated to Philadelphia, moving into a house with members of Swearin' and other punk bands. This is where the current full band Radiator Hospital lineup settled, also featuring guitarist/vocalist Cynthia Schemmer, bassist Jon Rybicki, and drummer Jeff Bolt.

Their first official full-length, Something Wild, was released in the summer of 2013 on Salinas Records. It was recorded partially in the same lo-fi manner as earlier cassettes, but added a more studio honed production sound (provided by Swearin' guitarist/vocalist Kyle Gilbride) on the more energetic full-band songs.

Their next album Torch Song, also recorded with Gilbride, was released in 2014, and brought the band wider recognition. In 2017 Radiator Hospital released Play the Songs You Like, which had been recorded by Jeff Zeigler.

Another album, Sings 'Music For Daydreaming', was released in early 2019. It was also recorded with Zeigler and is the first full-length album credited to Radiator Hospital to be performed entirely by Cook-Parrott since 2011.

On May 25, 2023, Radiator Hospital released Can't Make Any Promises, which was recorded once again with Kyle Gilbride.

Radiator Hospital's recorded output often features collaborations with other vocalists, such as Allison and Katie Crutchfield, Maryn Jones, and Elaiza Santos. Likewise Cook-Parrott has contributed to recordings by Waxahatchee, Japanese Breakfast and Allison Crutchfield.

== Discography ==
=== Albums ===
- My Most Imaginary Friend - Amanda Bynes Tapes, Cassette, MP3 (2010)
- Nothin' In My Eyes - Lafayette Records, Cassette, MP3 (2011)
- Something Wild - Salinas Records LP, MP3 (2013)
- Torch Song - Salinas Records, LP, MP3 (2014)
- Play the Songs You Like - Salinas Records, LP, MP3 (2017)
- Sings 'Music for Daydreaming' - Salinas Records, LP, MP3 (2019)
- Can't Make Any Promises - Salinas Records, LP, streaming (2023)
- Distorting Time - Lame-O Records (2026)

=== EPs ===
- I Want To Believe - Stupid Bag Records, 7", MP3 (2011)
- Can You Feel My Heart Beating? - Amanda Bynes Tapes, Cassette, MP3 (2012) / Party Nogg, 7", MP3 (2013)
- Some Distant Moon - Forward Records, 7", MP3 (2012)
- Mall of America - Double Double Whammy, Cassette, MP3 (2013) / Forward Records, 10" EP, MP3 (2014)
- New Depression (2020)
- Watching a Fire (2023)

=== Split releases ===
- Split with Fred Thomas - Already Dead Tapes, Cassette, MP3 (2012)
- Split with Kyle Kaos - Already Dead Tapes, Cassette, MP3 (2014)
- Split with Krill, Ovlov, and LVL UP - Double Double Whammy and Exploding In Sound, 7", MP3 (2014)
- Split with Sorority Noise - Soft Speak Records, 7", MP3 (2014)
- Split with Martha - Specialist Subject Records, 7", MP3 (2015)
- Visiting Waters #1 - Apollonian Sound, MP3 (2015)
- The Great Thunder Radiator Hospital Wedding Album - Stupid Bag Records, LP, MP3 (2016)
