= Pat Kearns =

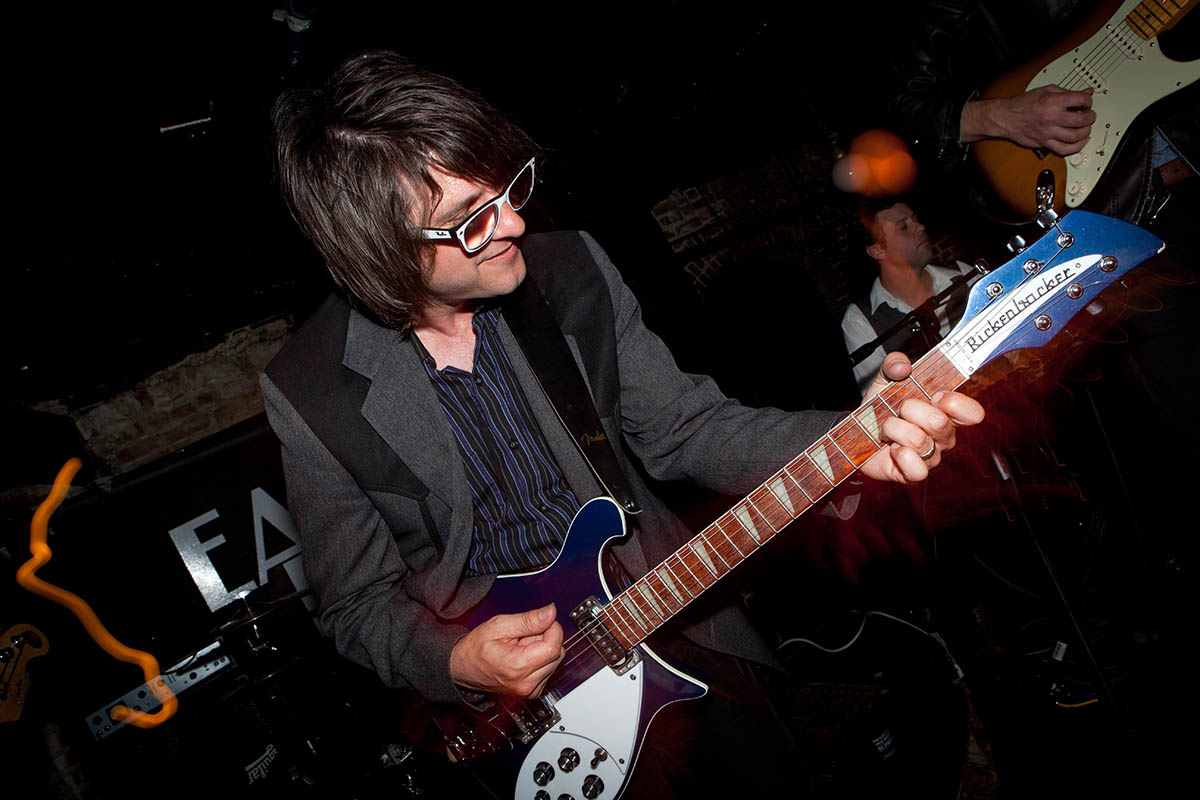
- Pat Kearns

Background information
- Born: November 10, 1970 (age 55); Portland, Oregon,
- Genres: Rock
- Occupations: Singer-songwriter, musician, record producer, biologist
- Instruments: Vocals, guitar, piano
- Years active: 1995–present
- Labels: King of Hearts, Velvafonic, Super Big Ltd., Permapress.
- Website: Pat Kearns

Pat Kearns (born November 10, 1970) is an American record producer, recording engineer, songwriter, guitarist and vocalist. He is best known for his work as singer/songwriter for Portland, Oregon-based band Blue Skies for Black Hearts, as well as his production and engineering work for a wide variety of artists, including The Exploding Hearts, Lovvers, Pat MacDonald, Sons of Huns, Walter Salas-Humara and Jerry Joseph. His credits include Guitar Romantic, The Exploding Hearts' first album, which Pitchfork ranked no. 60 on its list of the top 200 albums of the 2000s.

== Producer/Engineer ==
Kearns began working as a recording engineer in 1995 after a stint as a DJ at KCMU in Seattle. He opened his first studio, Studio 13, in 1997. In 2002, he produced and recorded The Exploding Hearts' Guitar Romantic, which heralded a revival of '70s-style pop-punk. Released in April 2003 by Dirtnap Records, the first wholesale pressing of 1,000 vinyl LPs sold out in two days. Critic Matt LeMay, writing in Pitchfork, praised the record as "simply an awesome power-pop record." Maximum Rock and Roll called Guitar Romantic "the best album of the past five years in the April 2003 issue 5; the record received 4.5 stars out of on All Music. Shortly after the release of Guitar Romantic, band members Adam Cox, Matt Fitzgerald, and Jeremy Gage were killed in a car accident, after which the band ceased to exist. Guitar Romantic went on to sell 30,000 copies.

Kearns opened PermaPress Studio in 2007. Since that time, his production/recording credits include Lovvers' OCD Go Go Go Girls; Pat MacDonald's Troubador of Stomp; Sons of Huns' Banishment Ritual; Jerry Joseph's into the Lovely; and Walter Salas-Humara's Curve and Shake. Kearns is also a house engineer at Jackpot Recording in Portland, Oregon, and a contributor to the influential recording industry publication Tape Op.

== Recording artist ==
In conjunction with his production work, Kearns is also a songwriter, musician and recording artist. Since 2000, he has been songwriter, lead vocalist and guitarist of Blue Skies for Black Hearts, a power-pop band he formed as a studio recording outlet for his compositions. Blue Skies has had a rotating cast of musicians with Kearns being the only member to appear on all recordings. The band has recorded six studio albums to date, including Embracing the Modern Age; Portland Mercury said "virtually every song sounds like a forgotten hit from bygone days, with all of its pop puzzle pieces snapping together tightly—immaculate arrangements with just the right amount of scuzz..." Blue Skies for Black Hearts recorded a Daytrotter Session in 2012.

Kearns also records and performs as a solo act.

Kearns scored the music for the documentary "It's a Ring Thing: The Portland Horse Project,” which tells the story of conceptual artist Scott Wayne Indiana’s Horse Project. His compositions, recorded by Blue Skies for Black Hearts, have been featured on The Today Show, the feature film Love Hurts starring Janeane Garofalo, the HBO series Eastbound & Down, The X Factor and in promotional installations for Nike, Adidas and Abercrombie & Fitch.

== Discography ==
- This Black Heart is Gonna Break (2002)
- Turn the Light Out(2006)
- Love is Not Enough (2006)
- Serenades and Hand Grenades (2008)
- Embracing the Modern Age (2011)
- Blue Skies for Black Hearts (2014)

=== Production/engineering credits ===
- 13 Savage Garage Punk Rippers – The Undertakers, 2001
- Sex-Caliber Horsepower – Goddamn Gentleman, 2001
- Rinse and Repeate – The Jolenes, 2003
- Guitar Romantic – The Exploding Hearts, 2003
- So What’s Left Now – The Observers, 2004
- Rise or Fall – Defiance, 2004
- The Nice Boys – The Nice Boys, 2006
- Shattered – The Exploding Hearts, 2006 (mastering)
- Troubador of Stomp – Pat MacDonald, 2007
- The Day We Transposed – Daytime Volume, 2007
- Teen Bop Dream – The Soda Pop Kids, 2007
- Revised Observations – The Revisions, 2007
- J'Aime Les Filles – Clorox Girls, 2007
- Heart Geometry – The Fast Computers, 2007
- This Restless Enterprise – The Very Foundation, 2009
- The Welfare State – High Times, 2010
- Into the Lovely – Jerry Joseph & The Jackmormons, 2012
- Banishment Ritual – Sons of Huns, 2013
- S/T – The Mandates, 2013 (mixing/mastering)
- Curve and Shake – Walter Salas-Humara, 2014
- I'm Lookin' for a Heart, Terry and Louie (from The Exploding Hearts; mixing/mastering), 2014
