= The White Wires =

Canadian garage rock band

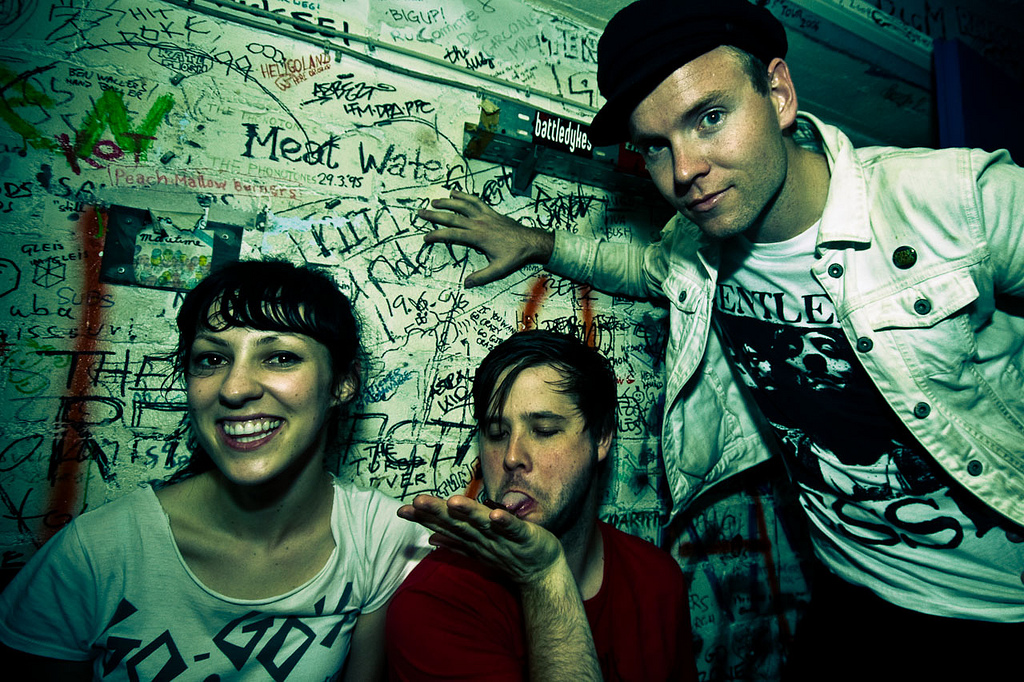

Background information
- Origin: Ottawa, Ontario
- Genre: Garage rock
- Years active: 2007–present
- Labels: Going Gaga; Ugly Pop; Trouble in Mind; Douchemaster; P. Trash; Dirtnap
- Members: Allie Hanlon; Ian Manhire; Luke Martin
- Website: myspace.com/theewhitewires

The White Wires were a Canadian garage rock band formed in Ottawa, Ontario, in 2007. The band is in rotation on CBC Radio. The Ottawa Citizen calls the band "energetic and entertaining" with a clear sense of mission, while the Ottawa Sun identifies them as one of the city’s "favourite bands".

The White Wires first 2008 independent release Girly Girly Girly was reissued in 2009 on Douchemaster as a self-titled The White Wires. The band's second album WWII was released in 2010 on Dirtnap. The band's third album WWIII was released in the summer of 2012.

== History ==
=== Origin ===
In July 2007, Manhire (formerly of the Cryptomaniacs) moved to Ottawa from Calgary. Manhire is the founder of Going Gaga Records, the founder of Ottawa's music festival Going Gaga Weekend, and co-founder of the "Rock N' Roll Pizza Party" (RRPP) events. The White Wires members are Luke Martin (also of Street Meat, Million Dollar Marxists), Allie Hanlon (also of Peach Kelli Pop), and Ian Manhire (also of the Sedatives).

The White Wires were formed in September 2007 in Ottawa at one of the city's RRPP events. The band's name is taken from a song written by primary lyricist Manhire. The band first played under this moniker at their performance 28 December 2007 at the Cafe Dekcuf.

=== Girly Girly Girly (2008–2009) ===
The band's first full-length album Girly Girly Girly was released independently in 2008 on Manhire's label Going Gaga. The vinyl album had a limited pressing of 325 copies. It was reissued as a self-titled album The White Wires 3 November 2009 on Atlanta's Douchemaster Records and was made available on Apple's iTunes service 14 September 2009. Also in 2009, the band contributed the single "Let It Go" to Ottawa Gaga Volume One released on Going Gaga.

In August 2009, the band signed for a new album with Portland, Oregon's punk rock music label Dirtnap Records. Also, the band finished recording two complete 45's. The first 45 rpm single was "Pretty Girl". It was released 11 September 2009 on Chicago's Trouble in Mind Records. The second 45 rpm single was "Pogo Til I Puke Tonight". This recording was released March 2010 on Toronto's Ugly Pop Records.

=== WWII (2010–2011) ===
The band recorded a cover of The Messengers' 1971 song "That's the Way a Woman Is". The four track various artists' compilation album Trouble in Mind 7-inch was released 17 April 2010 by Chicago's Trouble in Mind Records. Only 1,000 copies of this 7-inch EP were pressed as part of a promotional compilation featuring cover songs by Trouble in Mind artists.

In 2010, the band recorded a cover of The Nerves song "Letter to G" written by Jack Lee. It was initially released as an audio cassette 27 December 2010 on Los Angeles' Volar Records titled Under the Covers: A Tribute to Paul Collins, Peter Case and Jack Lee.

In March 2010, The White Wires met The Mean Jeans a band from Portland, Oregon. The two bands became good friends and decided to record together. The first single from this collaboration was "Please Write" released 31 August 2010 on Dirtnap Records. The band's second single from their collaboration "Born on a Saturday Night" from the split-single I Remember How / Born on a Saturday Night was a song written by The Mean Jeans. The single was co-released 2 September 2010 on German P. Trash Records and German Timmeheiehumme Records to coincide with the band's European tour.

Their second full-length album, WWII, was released to Apple's iTunes service 30 November 2010. The first single from their 2010 album WWII was "Be True to Your School ('Til You Get Kicked Out)".

The band's third album WWIII is expected for release in July 2012.

== Live performances ==
The band played the Ottawa Bluesfest 17 July 2010. The band played the Halifax Pop Explosion 22 October 2010. The band's release party for WWII was 23 December 2010 at the Babylon Club in Ottawa.

== Band members ==
- Ian Manhire – lyricist, lead vocals, guitar (2007–present)
- Luke Martin – bass guitar, backing vocals (2007–present)
- Allie Hanlon – drums (2007–present)

== Discography ==
=== Singles ===
Pretty Girl (TIM002)

- Released: 11 September 2009
- Format: 7-inch Vinyl 45 RPM
- Label: Trouble in Mind
- Tracks: "Pretty Girl", "Goodbye Girl"

Pogo 'Til I Puke Tonight (UP022)

- Released: March 2010
- Format: 7-inch Vinyl 45 RPM
- Label: Ugly Pop
- Tracks: "Pogo Til I Puke Tonight", "Don't Call Me When You're Ill"

"Be True to Your School ('Til You Get Kicked Out)" from the album WWII

- Released: 2010
- Format: LP/Digital
- Label: Dirtnap
- Tracks: Be True to Your School ('Til You Get Kicked Out)

==== Split singles ====
"Please Write" (ZZZ-102) from the album Please Write / R U Mental?

- Released: 31 August 2010
- Format: 7-inch Vinyl 45 RPM
- Label: Dirtnap
- Tracks: "Please Write" The White Wires, "R U Mental?" The Mean Jeans

I Remember How / Born on a Saturday Night (P. Trash 66 / THH002)

- Released: 2 September 2010
- Format: 7-inch Vinyl 45 RPM
- Label: P. Trash / Timmeheiehumme
- Tracks: "I Remember How" The Mean Jeans (written by The White Wires), "Born on a Saturday Night" The White Wires (written by The Mean Jeans)

==== Various artists compilations ====
"Let It Go" (GGR005) from the album Ottawa Gaga Volume One

- Released: 2009
- Format: LP
- Label: Going Gaga
- Tracks: "Greatest Hit" The Beach Blankets, "Saturday Night" The Visitors, "Teenage Runaway" The Sedatives, "B'n'E" The Mother's Children, "Nuthouse Inn" The Botched Suicides, "NST" The Band Whose Name Is A Symbol, "Cut Up" Million Dollar Marxists, "Wires MKII" Suppositories, "It's Not Right" The Creeps, "Dance With Me" The Felines, "Crawling Around" The Savage Crimes, "Cowboy Souffle" Fucking Machines, "Enter Man Man" Holy Cobras, "Let It Go" The White Wires, "Walking" Uranium Comeback

"That's the Way a Woman Is" (TIM012) from the album Trouble in Mind 7-inch

- Released: 17 April 2010
- Format: 7-inch Vinyl 33 ⅓ RPM
- Label: Trouble in Mind
- Tracks: "2 + 2 = ?" Ty Segall (original Bob Seger), "Messenger" CoCoComa (original The Wipers), "That's the Way a Woman Is" The White Wires (original The Messengers), (Note: Written by John Hoier and Michael Morgan.: "That's The Way A Woman Is / In The Jungle (7-inch)". Discogs.com. 1971.) "7 and 7 Is" Charlie & The Moonhearts (original Arthur Lee)

"Letter to G" (VOLAR08-10) from the album Under the Covers: A Tribute to Paul Collins, Peter Case and Jack Lee

- Released: 27 December 2010
- Format: originally cassette
- Label: Volar
- Tracks: "Walking Out on Love" Grass Widow, "Stand Back and Take a Good Look" Reading Rainbow, "Letter to G" The White Wires, "When U Find Out" Hunx and His Punx, "A Million Miles Away" The Mantles, "Gimme Some Time" White Fence, "Why Am I Lonely" Audacity, "Any Day Now" Personal and the Pizzas, "Hanging on the Telephone" Davila 666, "Paper Dolls" Le Face, "One Way Ticket" Tijuana Panthers, "Working Too Hard" So Cow, "Now" Neverever, "I Need Your Love" The Moonhearts, "I Don't Fit In" Shark Toys, "Are You Famous" Ratas Del Vaticano, "You Won't Be Happy" The Forgery Series, "Many Roads to Follow" Cowabunga Babes

=== Albums ===
Girly Girly Girly (album) (Note: iTunes lists the band's name as Self Titled.: "Self Titled". iTunes.ca Store. Apple Inc. 14 September 2009. Archived from the original on 11 November 2012.) (DMR033 reissue as The White Wires)

- Released: 2008
- Format: LP/Digital
- Label: Going Gaga, (Note: Catalogue GGR002.: Library and Archives Canada. "AMICUS No. 34545701". Collectionscanada.gc.ca.) Douchemaster (Note: Catalogue DMR033; reissue date 3 November 2009.: "Douchemaster Records". Douchemasterrecords.blogspot.com.)
- Tracks: "Girly Girly Girly", "I Remember How", "Stayed Up Late", "Yeah Yeah Yeah Yeah Yeah", "Is Everything Square", "Ha Ha Holiday", "In My Bed", "Your Mother Says You're Ugly", "You're No Good for Me"

WWII (album) (ZZZ-98)

- Released: 30 November 2010
- Label: Dirtnap
- Tracks: "Let's Go to the Beach", "Roxanne", "Did You Forget My Name", "I Can Tell", "Just Wanna Be With You", "Be True to Your School ('Til You Get Kicked Out)", "Popularity", "Hands", "Are You Mad", "Outta My Mind", "Summer Girl", "Bye Bye Baby"
- Singles: "Be True To Your School ('Til You Get Kicked Out)"

== Footnotes ==
=== References ===
- Manhire, Ian. "GGR002 - the WHITE WIRES - GIRLY GIRLY GIRLY LP". Goinggagarecords.bigcartel.com.
- "The White Wires: "Girly Girly Girly" (NBH) Single (2009)". Cokemachineglow.com.
- Adrian Mack (11 November 2010). "Does Your Bubblegum Lose its Flavour?". TheTyee.ca.
