= Peach Kelli Pop II =

Studio album by Peach Kelli Pop
- Released: December 12, 2012
- Genre: punk rock, garage rock
- Length: 20:00 (CD)
- Label: Burger Records
- Producer: Peach Kelli Pop

Peach Kelli Pop chronology
Peach Kelli Pop I (2010)	Peach Kelli Pop II (2012)	Peach Kelli Pop III (2015)

Singles from Peach Kelli Pop II
- 1. "Red Leather" Released: 2010

Peach Kelli Pop II is the second album by the Canadian/American Rock band Peach Kelli Pop, released in 2012 on Burger Records. This was Peach Kelli Pop’s first album with Burger Records.

== Track listing ==
All tracks are written by Peach Kelli Pop

LP
No.	Title	Length
1.	"Panchito Blues"	1:17
2.	"Dreamphone"	2:27
3.	"Scorpio"	1:44
4.	"Society of Enoch"	2:17
5.	"Red Leather"	2:09
6.	"Original Sin"	2:49
7.	"True Blue"	1:03
8.	"Julie Oulie"	2:01
9.	"ABC"	1:51
10.	"Tough Stuff"	2:04

== Production ==
- Kenneth Maclaurin – album design
- Chilimac – cover photo
- Seth Sutton – back photo
