= The Goodbye Party =

American power pop musician

- Genres: power pop
- Years active: 2012–present
- Labels: Salinas Records, Double Double Whammy, Stupid Bag Records
- Website: thegoodbyeparty.bandcamp.com

The Goodbye Party is the stage name of American power pop musician Michael Cantor. Cantor is based in Lansdowne, Pennsylvania.

== History ==
Cantor was originally a member of the band The Ambulars, who released one album on Salinas Records in 2012. He released his first album under the moniker The Goodbye Party in 2014, titled Silver Blues, through Salinas Records. Cantor did not release new music with the project until 2020, when they announced a new album. The album, Beautiful Motors, was released on Double Double Whammy on October 9, 2020. In 2021, Cantor released his third album as The Goodbye Party, titled Stray Sparks. The album received positive reviews, and in 2023 Joey Doubek of Speedy Ortiz included it in their list of "10 essential Philadelphia records".

=== The Afterglows ===
Cantor also plays in a band called The Afterglows with Sam Cook-Parrott of Radiator Hospital. They have released two albums, The Afterglows in 2016, and The Sound of The Afterglows in 2022.

== Discography ==
=== As The Goodbye Party ===
Title	Album details
Silver Blues	Released: 1 December 2014; Label: Salinas Records; Format: Digital download, LP
Beautiful Motors	Released: 9 October 2020; Label: Double Double Whammy; Format: Digital download, LP
Stray Sparks	Released: 12 November 2021; Label: Double Double Whammy; Format: Digital download, cassette

=== With The Afterglows ===
Title	Album details
The Afterglows	Released: 19 August 2016; Label: Salinas Records, Stupid Bag Records; Format: Digital download, LP, cassette
The Sound of The Afterglows	Released: 22 February 2022; Label: None; Format: Digital download, cassette
