= Arc in Round =

- Origin: Philadelphia, Pennsylvania
- Genres: Shoegazing, psychedelic rock, ambient pop
- Years active: 2006–present
- Labels: Bubble Core Records, La Société Expéditionnaire
- Members: Jeff Zeigler, Mikele Edwards, Matt Ricchini, Josh Meakim
- Website: arcinround.bandcamp.com

Arc in Round (formerly known as Relay) is a Philadelphia, Pennsylvania-based band founded by multi-instrumentalist and audio engineer Jeff Zeigler. Their music has been described as neo-psychedelia, post-rock, "a swirl of krautrock and shoegaze", and ambient pop. As Relay, they released the EP Type/Void in August 2006 on Bubble Core Records, on which they released their debut album, Still Point of Turning, in October of the same year. In 2012, they released their eponymous first album as Arc in Round on the label La Société Expéditionnaire.

== Discography ==
=== As Relay ===
- Type/Void (Bubble Core EP, 2006)
- Still Point of Turning (Bubble Core, 2006)

=== As Arc in Round ===
- Arc in Round (La Société Expéditionnaire, 2012)
