= Gentle Leader =

Studio album by Peach Kelli Pop
- Released: May 25, 2018
- Recorded: July 2017
- Studio: Golden Beat Studios
- Genre: garage rock, indie pop
- Length: 23:19
- Label: Mint Records
- Producer: Peach Kelli Pop

Peach Kelli Pop chronology
Peach Kelli Pop III (2015)	Gentle Leader (2018)

Professional ratings
Review scores
Source	Rating
Exclaim!	7/10 stars

Gentle Leader is the fourth album by the Canadian/American rock band Peach Kelli Pop, released in 2018 by Mint Records. It is the first Peach Kelli Pop record not solely written by Allie Hanlon.

The first track, "Hello Kitty Knife" was released in early April 2018. "Black Cat 13" was released in late April.

On June 1, 2018, Gentle Leader was "Album of the Day" on Bandcamp.

== Track listing ==
All tracks are written by Allie Hanlon, except where noted.

No.	Title	Length
1.	"Hello Kitty Knife"	2:00
2.	"Honey" (Hanlon, Tracey Thorn/Marine Girls)	2:10
3.	"Black Magic"	2:35
4.	"Parasomnia"	3:41
5.	"Quiet" (Hanlon, Gina Negrini)	1:32
6.	"Black Cat 13"	1:48
7.	"King Size"	2:45
8.	"Don't Push Me"	1:47
9.	"Cherry (That's not her real name)"	2:14
10.	"Skylight"	2:42
Total length:		23:19

== Production ==
- Recorded by Andrew Schubert at Golden Beat Studios
- Jesse Gander – mastering
- Roland Cosio – mixing
- Roland Cosio and Allie Hanlon – producers
