= Peach Kelli Pop III =

Studio album by Peach Kelli Pop
- Released: April 1, 2015
- Genre: punk rock, garage rock
- Length: 20:24 (CD)
- Label: Burger Records
- Producer: Peach Kelli Pop

Peach Kelli Pop chronology
| Peach Kelli Pop II (2012) | Peach Kelli Pop III (2015) | Gentle Leader (2018) |

Singles from Peach Kelli Pop III
- 1. "Princess Castle 1987" Released: 2015; 2. "Heart Eyes" Released: 2015

Peach Kelli Pop III is the third album by the Canadian-American rock band Peach Kelli Pop, released in 2015 on Burger Records.

== Track listing ==
All tracks are written by Allie Hanlon, except where noted

LP
| No. | Title | Length |
|---|---|---|
| 1. | "Princess Castle 1987" | 1:28 |
| 2. | "Shampoo" | 1:25 |
| 3. | "Heart Eyes" | 3:16 |
| 4. | "Bat Wing" | 2:44 |
| 5. | "Nude Beach" | 2:04 |
| 6. | "Plastic Love" | 2:10 |
| 7. | "Big Man" (Allie Hanlon, Emily Hanlon) | 1:55 |
| 8. | "Sailor Moon" (Tetsuya Komoro, Andy Heyward; originally performed by Nicole & Bynne Price) | 1:08 |
| 9. | "New Moon" | 2:01 |
| 10. | "Please Come Home" | 2:18 |

== Production ==
- Recorded by Joel Jerome at ARW studio 12/14
- Mike Lavin – mastering
- Kenneth Maclaurin – album design
- Abby Banks – cover photo
- Eva Barron – insert photo
- Alyssa Lswolsky – additional photoshopping
