= Peach Kelli Pop I =

Studio album by Peach Kelli Pop
- Released: December 12, 2012
- Genre: punk rock, garage rock
- Length: 23:00 (CD)
- Label: Going Gaga Records/ Infinity Cat Recordings
- Producer: Peach Kelli Pop

Peach Kelli Pop chronology
Peach Kelli Pop I (2012)	Peach Kelli Pop II (2012)

Singles from Peach Kelli Pop I
- 1. "Do the Eggroll" Released: 2010

Peach Kelli Pop I is the debut album by the Canadian/American Rock band Peach Kelli Pop, released in 2010 on Going Gaga Records.

== Track listing ==
All tracks are written by Peach Kelli Pop, except where noted

LP
No.	Title	Length
1.	"Do the Eggroll"	2:00
2.	"Doo Wah Diddy"	2:35
3.	"Guy 4 Me"	2:29
4.	"Lover"	2:30
5.	"Bunny Luv"	2:51
6.	"Standing in Front of Poseur" (Steven McDonald, Jeff McDonald)	2:27
7.	"Girls of Summer"	2:07
8.	"Knockout"	2:18
9.	"Badd News"	2:21
10.	"Not Your Girl"	2:04
11.	"Eenie Meenie Minie Moe"	2:04

== Production ==
- Kenneth Maclaurin – album design
- Perry Shall – album design editing
- Alyssa Iswolsky – Photos
