= Fix My Brain =

Studio album by The Marked Men
- Released: May 16, 2006
- Genre: Punk rock
- Length: 28:51
- Label: Swami
- Producer: The Marked Men

The Marked Men chronology
On the Outside (2004)	Fix My Brain (2006)	Ghosts (2009)

Professional ratings
Review scores
Source	Rating
AllMusic	4/5 stars

Fix My Brain is the third studio album by the Denton, Texas punk rock band The Marked Men, released May 16, 2006, by Swami Records.

== Track listing ==
- All songs written by The Marked Men
1. "A Little Time" – 2:02
2. "Sully My Name" – 2:06
3. "It's Not a Crime" – 1:53
4. "A Little Lesson" – 2:34
5. "Wait Here, Wait for You" – 2:04
6. "Sophisticate" – 1:35
7. "Someday" – 2:17
8. "Fix My Brain" – 2:36
9. "Going Crazy" – 2:22
10. "You Said Enough" – 2:38
11. "Don't Look at Me" – 2:34
12. "Sadist" – 2:55
13. "Stay Home" – 2:09

== Personnel ==
- Jeff Burke – guitar, lead vocals
- Mark Ryan – guitar, lead vocals, cover design
- Joe Ayoub – bass guitar
- Mike Throneberry – drum kit, backing vocals
- Dave Gardner – mastering
- Krissy Throneberry – cover photo
- Recorded, engineered, produced, and mixed by The Marked Men
