= Fall Into the Sun =

Studio album by Swearin'
- Released: October 5, 2018
- Length: 33:14
- Label: Merge

Swearin' chronology
Surfing Strange (2013)	Fall Into the Sun (2018)

Singles from Fall Into the Sun
- 1. "Grow Into a Ghost" Released: July 23, 2018; 2. "Untitled (LA)" Released: August 13, 2018; 3. "Future Hell" Released: September 6, 2018

Professional ratings
Aggregate scores
Source	Rating
Metacritic	76/100
Review scores
Source	Rating
AllMusic	4/5 stars
DIY	4/5 stars
Exclaim!	8/10
The Line of Best Fit	7/10
Paste	8/10
Pitchfork	7.4/10

Fall Into the Sun is the fourth studio album by American band Swearin'. It was released on October 5, 2018, under Merge Records, and is the band's first album since reforming in 2017.

== Release ==
On July 23, 2018, Swearin' announced the release of the new album, along with the first single "Grow Into a Ghost".

The second single "Untitled (LA)" was released on August 13, 2018, and focuses Crutchfield's life in California.

The third single "Future Hell" was released on September 6, 2018. Kyle Gilbride explained the single is based on "visions of an unseen place and time, learning lessons of disenchantment from a new and hostile world. Finding a way back, friendship and independence reveal marks on the trail."

On October 5, 2018, Swearin' released the music videos for "Grow Into a Ghost" and "Future Hell". The videos were presented in 3D, and directed by Jake Fogelnest.

== Tour ==
On April 18, 2018, the band announced a tour in support of the album for August 2018, with Mike Krol and Ought.

== Critical reception ==
Fall Into the Sun was met with "generally favorable" reviews from critics. At Metacritic, which assigns a weighted average rating out of 100 to reviews from mainstream publications, this release received an average score of 76, based on 9 reviews. Aggregator Album of the Year gave the release a 76 out of 100 based on a critical consensus of 11 reviews.

Joe Goggins from DIY said the album is the "best Swearin' record yet; that Allison and Kyle have not just reformed the band, but actually brought the creative best out of each other in doing so, is a powerful advert for reconciliation". Ian Gormely from Exclaim! mentioned "its sound is more robust, the songs more thoughtful and frankly, more mature," while impressed that it is "their best album to date, Fall Into the Sun is the sound of a band rebuilding itself one song at a time and becoming that much stronger in the process.

=== Accolades ===
Accolades for Fall Into the Sun
Publication	Accolade	Rank
The Skinny	The Skinny's Top 50 Albums of 2018	42

== Track listing ==
Fall Into the Sun track listing
No.	Title	Writer(s)	Length
1.	"Big Change"	Allison Crutchfield; Kyle Gilbride	3:03
2.	"Dogpile"	Crutchfield; Gilbride	3:06
3.	"Grow Into a Ghost"	Crutchfield; Gilbride	3:11
4.	"Margaret"	Crutchfield; Gilbride	2:14
5.	"Stablize"	Crutchfield; Gilbride	4:41
6.	"Untitled (LA)"	Crutchfield; Gilbride	3:05
7.	"Treading"	Crutchfield; Gilbride	2:57
8.	"Oil and Water"	Crutchfield; Gilbride	3:04
9.	"Smoke or Steam"	Crutchfield; Gilbride	2:57
10.	"Anyway"	Crutchfield; Gilbride	2:10
11.	"Future Hell"	Crutchfield; Gilbride	2:46

== Personnel ==
Musicians

- Allison Crutchfield – vocals
- Kyle Gilbride – guitar
- Jeff Bolt – drums

Production

- Dave Gardner – mastering
- Alexander Rotondo – photographer

== Charts ==
Chart performance for Fall Into the Sun
Chart (2018)	Peak position
US Independent Albums (Billboard)	47
US Heatseekers Albums (Billboard)	15
