= All Dogs =

American pop punk band

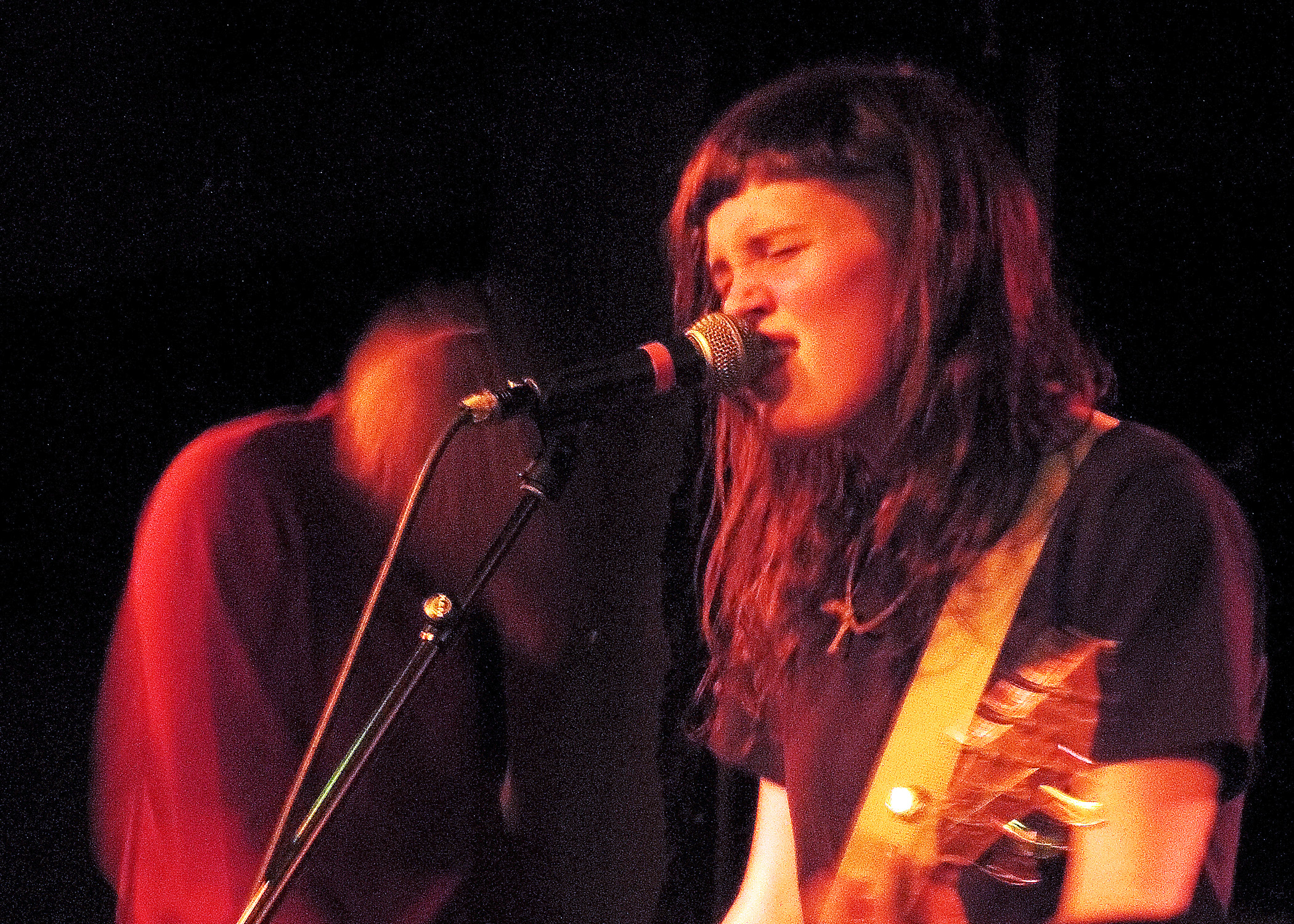
- All Dogs performing at the Black Cat, 2014

Background information
- Origin: Columbus, Ohio, Philadelphia, Pennsylvania
- Genres: Pop punk, indie rock
- Years active: 2012–present
- Labels: Salinas Records
- Members: Maryn Jones; Jesse Wither; Amanda Bartley; Nick Harris
- Website: alldogs.bandcamp.com

All Dogs is a pop punk quartet from Columbus, Ohio. Its members are singer/guitarist Maryn Jones, who has also played with Saintseneca, drummer Jesse Wither, who has also played with the punk band Delay, bassist Amanda Bartley of the band Swearin’, and guitarist Nick Harris, who also played in the Philadelphia based band Slaughter Beach, Dog.

== History ==
All Dogs was founded in 2012, and released their first cassette in July 2013, as their half of a split cassette with Slouch, another Ohio band. On this cassette, All Dogs contributed 6 songs, 5 of which were originals and one of which was a cover.

In 2015, the band released their debut album, Kicking Every Day, on Salinas Records. In the fall of 2016, the band performed their last show together before going on an extended hiatus. All Dogs' frontwoman, Maryn Jones, moved from Columbus to Philadelphia, Pennsylvania after Kicking Every Day was released. In 2018, Gabriela Claymore pointed out that "All Dogs’ fate remains uncertain now that its members are scattered between two cities, and Jones is no longer able to play in Saintseneca from out of state." In an interview with Claymore, Jones stated that "All Dogs stopped touring because of personal things."

In June 2023, they reunited for their first show in seven years, opening for Wednesday in a performance at the Philadelphia music venue Union Transfer. In June of 2025 All Dogs played 2 shows in celebration of the 10th anniversary of “Kicking Every Day.” The shows took place in New York City and Philadelphia. In addition to playing the majority of the album, the band’s setlist included a new song.

== Critical reception ==
All Dogs' debut cassette was described by Pitchfork Media as "pierced with a strong sense of yearning." Liz Perry wrote in Stereogum that the six songs All Dogs included on the cassette "contain more perfect anxiousness and earnestness than some bands can get out in a whole album." Laura Snapes, writing for Pitchfork, gave Kicking Every Day a rating of 7.6 out of 10, and described it as "a warm thump of encouragement from an equally grubby hand." Sasha Geffen, of Consequence of Sound, gave the album a B− and said that it "roils with internal confusions and frustrations," and that it is "awfully charming for something that’s eating itself alive from the inside." On April 1, 2016, lead vocalist of punk rock band Green Day posted a short clip of All Dogs' live performance on Instagram with the description "ALL DOGS!!!! great band".

== Discography ==
=== Albums ===
- Kicking Every Day - Salinas Records, LP, MP3 (2015)

=== EPs ===
- All Dogs - Salinas Records, 7", MP3 (2013)

=== Split Releases ===
- Split with Slouch - Self Released, Cassette, MP3 (2013)
