= On the Outside (The Marked Men album) =

Studio album by The Marked Men
- Released: May 18, 2004
- Genre: Punk rock
- Length: 27:56
- Label: Dirtnap

The Marked Men chronology
The Marked Men (2003)	On the Outside (2004)	Fix My Brain (2006)

Professional ratings
Review scores
Source	Rating
AllMusic	4/5 stars

On the Outside is the second studio album by the Denton, Texas punk rock band The Marked Men, released May 18, 2004 by Dirtnap Records.

== Track listing ==
- All songs written by The Marked Men
1. "On the Outside" – 2:22
2. "Don't Lose It" – 1:21
3. "Gone Away" – 2:07
4. "Broken Record" – 1:57
5. "No Time" – 2:04
6. "So What" – 1:17
7. "Right Here with You" – 2:54
8. "Doctor Dan" – 1:42
9. "Set You Right" – 2:04
10. "Still Waiting" – 2:47
11. "Cool Devices" – 1:26
12. "4,000 Times" – 2:25
13. "Master Wicked" – 3:30

== Personnel ==
- Jeff Burke – guitar, lead vocals
- Mark Ryan – guitar, lead vocals
- Joe Ayoub – bass guitar, backing vocals
- Mike Throneberry – drum kit
