= Peach Kelli Pop =

Canadian garage rock band

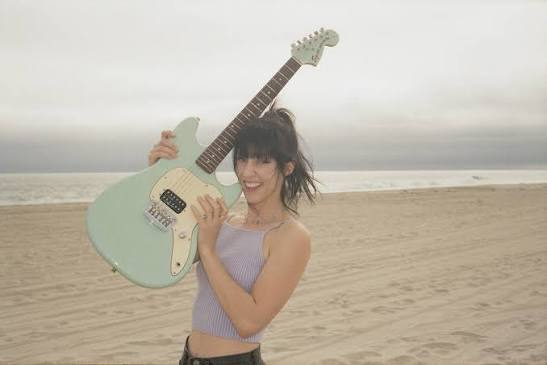

Background information
- Origin: Ottawa, Ontario
- Genres: Garage rock, power pop
- Years active: 2009–present
- Label: Mint Records
- Spinoff of: The White Wires
- Members: Allie Hanlon

Peach Kelli Pop is a Canadian garage rock band founded by Allie Hanlon in 2009 in Ottawa, Ontario. Allie Hanlon is the band's sole member and primary songwriter. On tour, Hanlon is accompanied on stage by various friends rather than a dedicated touring band.

Peach Kelli Pop's sound has been compared to 1960s girl groups and referred to as power pop. Hanlon cites the anime Sailor Moon as an influence on her style and covers the series' theme song during live performances and on her third album, Peach Kelli Pop III.

Hanlon was the drummer for the Canadian punk band The White Wires since their formation in 2007. In 2009, Hanlon began writing songs in her bedroom for a solo project that eventually became Peach Kelli Pop. In 2010, Hanlon released her first, self-titled album as Peach Kelli Pop I under Canadian label Going Gaga Records. In 2012 Peach Kelli Pop's second album, Peach Kelli Pop II, was released on Burger Records. The band's third album, titled Peach Kelli Pop III, was released by Bachelor and Burger Records in April 2015.

In May 2018, their fourth album, Gentle Leader, was released on Mint Records.

The band is named after a Redd Kross song from their 1987 album Neurotica.

== Discography ==
=== Albums ===
- Peach Kelli Pop I (2010, Going Gaga Records)
- Peach Kelli Pop II (2012, Bachelor Records, Burger Records)
- Peach Kelli Pop III (2015, Bachelor Records, Burger Records)
- Gentle Leader (2018, Mint Records)

=== Singles ===
- "Panchito Blues" (2012, Infinity Cat Recordings)
- "Mindreader" (2014, Porchcore)
- "Which Witch" (2018, Mint Records)
- “Lucky Star” (2020, Lauren Records)
