= Guitar Romantic =

Studio album by The Exploding Hearts
- Released: October 18, 2002
- Recorded: April 2002
- Genres: Power pop; punk rock
- Length: 28:33
- Labels: Dirtnap, Screaming Apple
- Producers: The Exploding Hearts, Pat Kearns

Guitar Romantic is the only studio album by American rock band The Exploding Hearts; it was released first by Screaming Apple Records in 2002, and then Dirtnap Records and in 2003.

== Reception ==
Professional ratings
Review scores
Source	Rating
AllMusic	5/5 stars
Pitchfork	8.8/10
Robert Christgau	(1-star Honorable Mention)
Stylus Magazine	C

Publication	Country	Accolade	Year	Rank
Pitchfork	US	The Top 200 Albums of the 2000s	2009	60

Pitchfork listed the song "Modern Kicks" at 290 in its list of "The Top 500 Tracks of the 2000s".

== Track listing ==
No.	Title	Writer(s)	Length
1.	"Modern Kicks"	Adam Cox, Jeremy Gage, Terry Six	3:18
2.	"I'm a Pretender"	King Louie Bankston, Cox	2:31
3.	"Thorns in Roses"	Bankston, Cox	2:42
4.	"You're Black & Blue"	Cox	2:05
5.	"Sleeping Aides & Razorblades"	Bankston, Cox	2:36
6.	"Rumours in Town"	Bankston, Cox	2:32
7.	"Throwaway Style"	Bankston, Cox	2:58
8.	"Boulevard Trash"	Bankston, Cox	2:10
9.	"Jailbird"	Bankston, Cox, Six	3:37
10.	"Still Crazy"	Cox, Gage, Six	4:04
