= Franc Roddam =

English film director

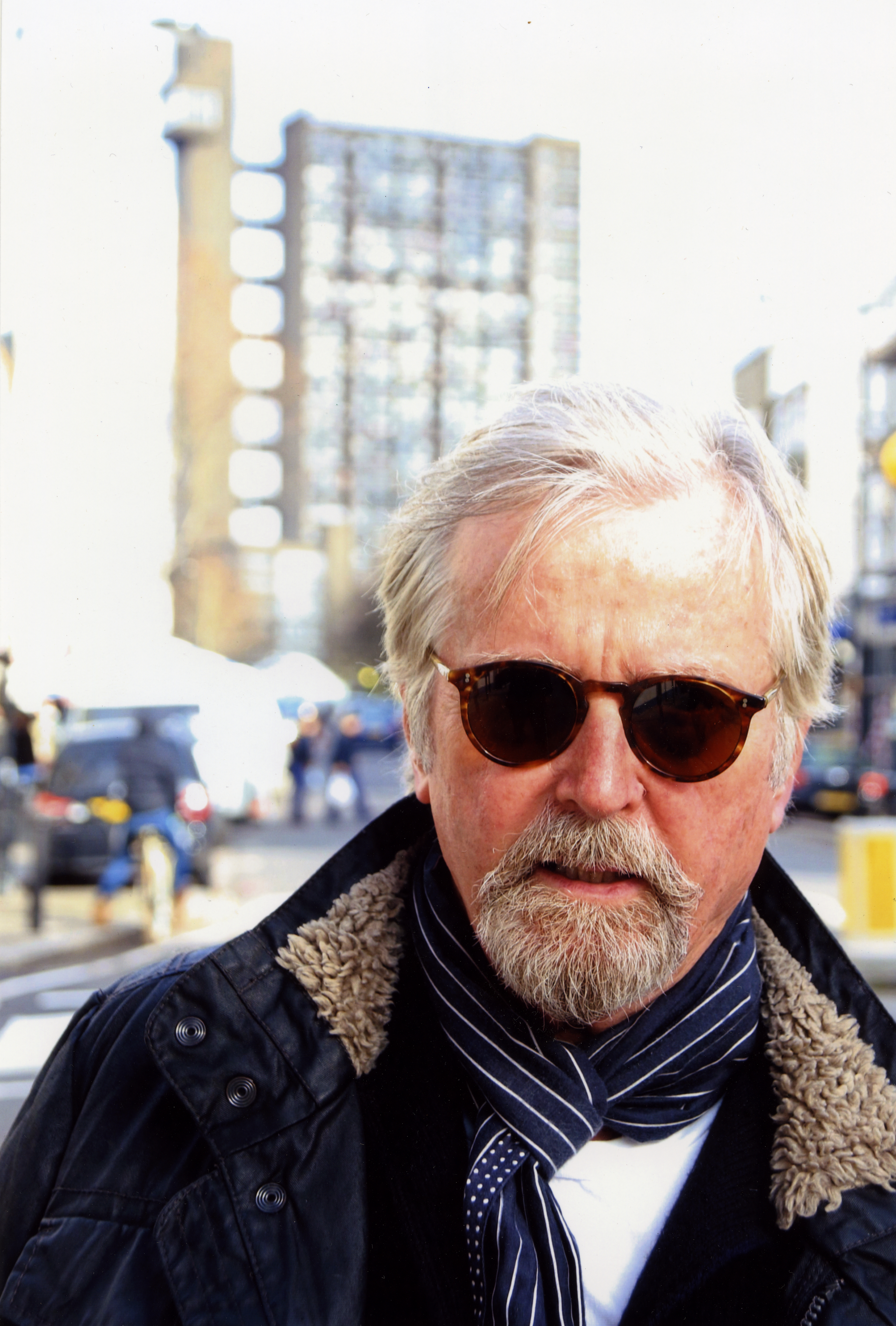
- Roddam in 2014
- Born: Francis George Roddam; 29 April 1946 (age 80); Norton, County Durham, England
- Education: London Film School
- Occupations: film director; businessman; screenwriter; television producer; publisher
- Years active: 1969–present
- Television: Auf Wiedersehen, Pet (1983–86, 2002–04); MasterChef (1990–2001, 2005–present)
- Website: Ziji Publishing

Francis George "Franc" Roddam (born 29 April 1946) is an English film director, businessman, screenwriter, television producer and publisher, best known as the creator of Auf Wiedersehen, Pet and Masterchef and as the director of Quadrophenia (1979). He is a graduate of the London Film School.

== Career ==
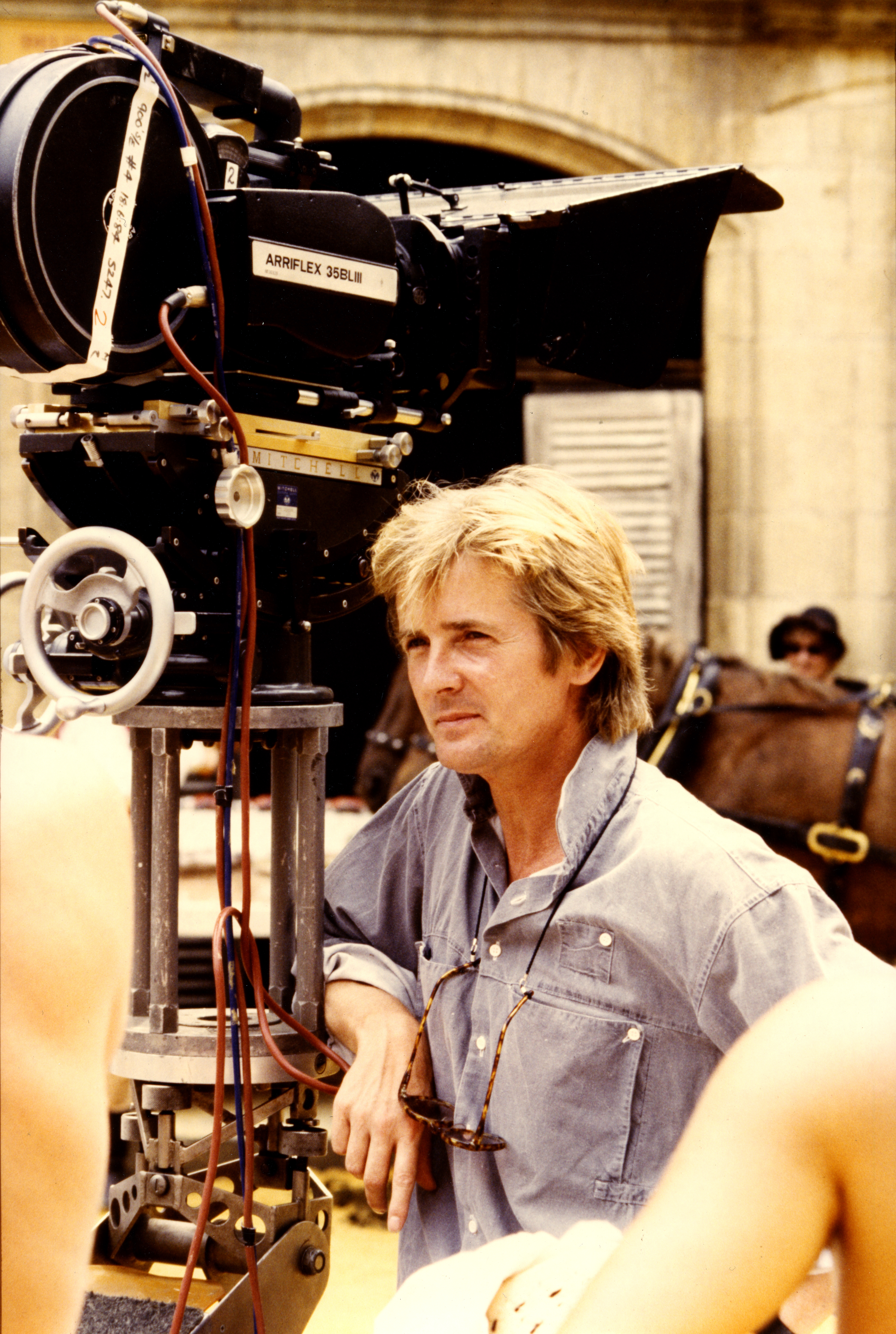
Roddam with an Arriflex film camera on the set of The Bride (1985)

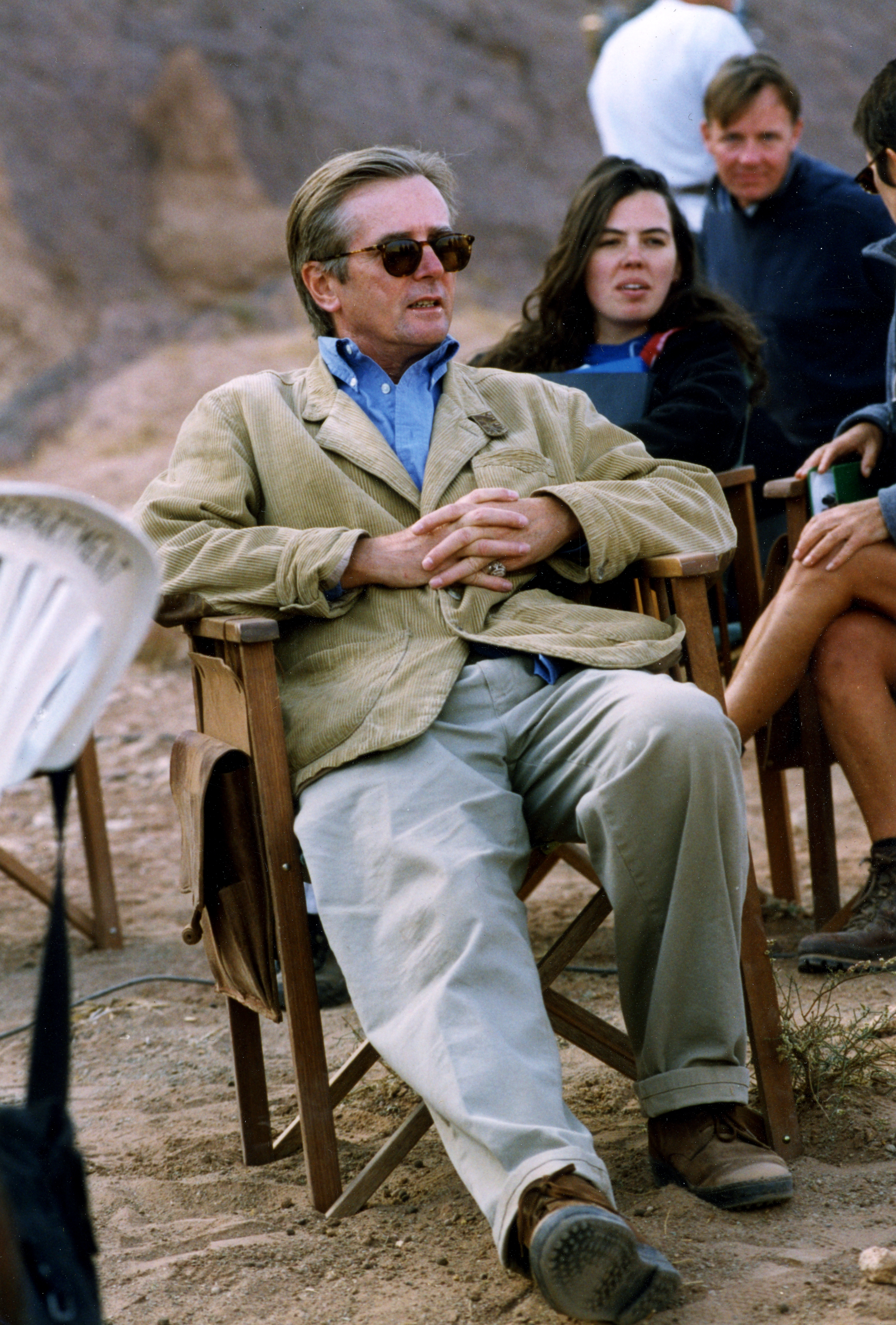
Roddam on the set of Cleopatra (1999)

Roddam's films include Quadrophenia, K2, Aria, The Lords of Discipline and War Party. He created the worldwide TV franchise, MasterChef, which is shown in 200 countries worldwide and there are over 50 locally-produced versions.

He also produced formats for Auf Wiedersehen, Pet, Making Out, and Harry, all of which were highly successful TV dramas. He directed the award-winning TV drama Dummy, which won the prestigious Prix Italia Drama Prize. He directed the Grammy-nominated/Golden Globe nominated US mini-series Moby Dick and Cleopatra.

Roddam won awards for his BBC documentaries Mini and The Family. He is the Director of Ziji Publishing, whose titles include the bestseller The Last Templar. He is a sponsor and former Governor of the London Film School, and is an active member of the Greenworld Campaign.

== Filmography ==
=== Films ===
- Quadrophenia (1979) – director/co-writer
- The Lords of Discipline (1983) – director
- The Bride (1985) – director
- Aria (1987) – segment director
- War Party (1988) – director
- K2 (1991) – director

=== Television ===
- Birthday (1969) – Director
- The Fight (1973) – Executive Producer
- The Family (1974) – co-director
- Mini (1975) – Director (episode of Inside Story documentary series)
- Dummy (1977) – director/producer
- Auf Wiedersehen, Pet (1983–2004) – format creator, executive producer, writer
- Johnny Oddball (1985) – director (episode of 40 Minutes documentary series; sequel to Mini)
- Making Out (1989) – format creator
- An Ungentlemanly Act (1992) – executive producer
- Harry (1993–1995) – format creator, executive producer
- The Crow Road (1996) – executive producer
- Cleopatra (1999) – director (two episodes)
- Moby Dick (1998) – director (two episodes)
- The Canterbury Tales (2003) – format creator, executive producer
- MasterChef (2005–to date) – format creator, executive producer (until 2015)
