= Saintseneca =

American folk rock band

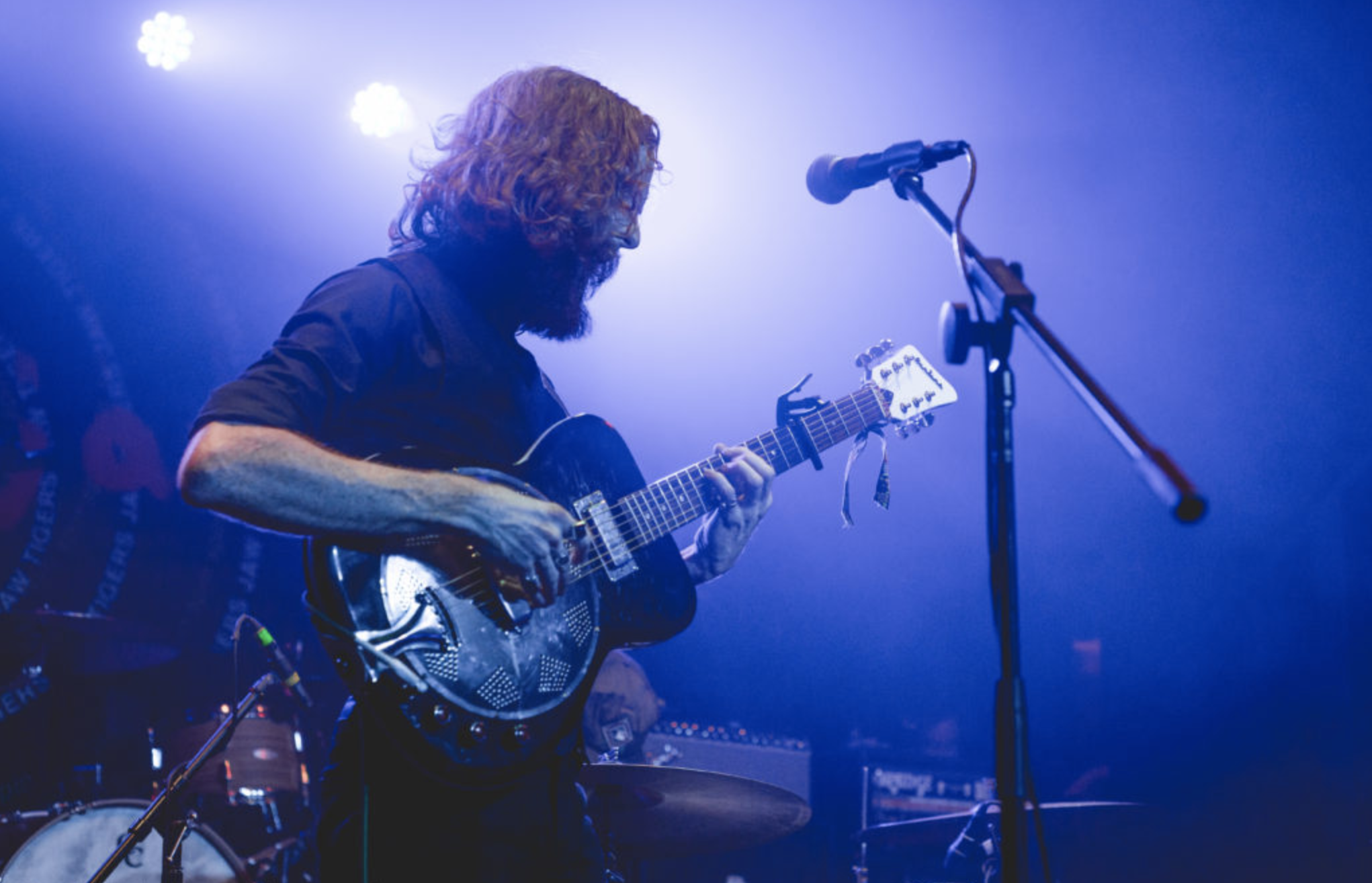
- Zac from Saintseneca

Background information
- Origin: Columbus, Ohio, United States
- Genres: Folk rock, alternative rock, indie rock, indie folk
- Years active: 2007–present
- Labels: ANTI-, Mama Bird Recording Co., Lame-O
- Members: Zac Little; Caeleigh Featherstone; Andy Cooke; Jessi Bream
- Past members: Steva Jacobs; Jonathan Meador; Rose Zinnia; Grace Chang; Luke Smith; Jon Washington; Maryn Jones; Mathew O’Conke
- Website: saintseneca.com

Saintseneca is an American folk rock band from Columbus, Ohio, that was formed in 2007 by singer-songwriter and multi-instrumentalist Zac Little. The current band is made of Zac Little, Caeleigh Featherstone, Jessi Bream, and Andy Cook. They are known for their diverse range of instrumentation in both their recordings, as well as in their live performances. The band have released three EPs and five albums Last (2011), Dark Arc (2014), Such Things (2015), Pillar of Na (2018), and Highwalllow & Supermoon Songs (2025). The band utilizes a wide range of acoustic instrumentation (balalaika, mandolin, dulcimer, bağlama, floor percussion) with more contemporary elements such as synthesizers and electric guitars.

== Biography ==
The band originated during Zac Little’s teenage years in a small Appalachian town in Noble County, Ohio. Little relocated to the city of Columbus, Ohio with original members Steva Jacobs and Luke Smith to attend Ohio State University. Throughout his college years in Columbus, Little accumulated and learned a number of instruments: banjo, mandolin, dulcimer and more, and upon meeting violinist Grace Chang, Saintseneca’s initial live line-up coalesced in the fall of 2008. This line-up toured regionally around the East Coast and released the four-track Saintseneca EP on September 1, 2009. This was followed with the release of the five track Grey Flag EP on March 30, 2010.

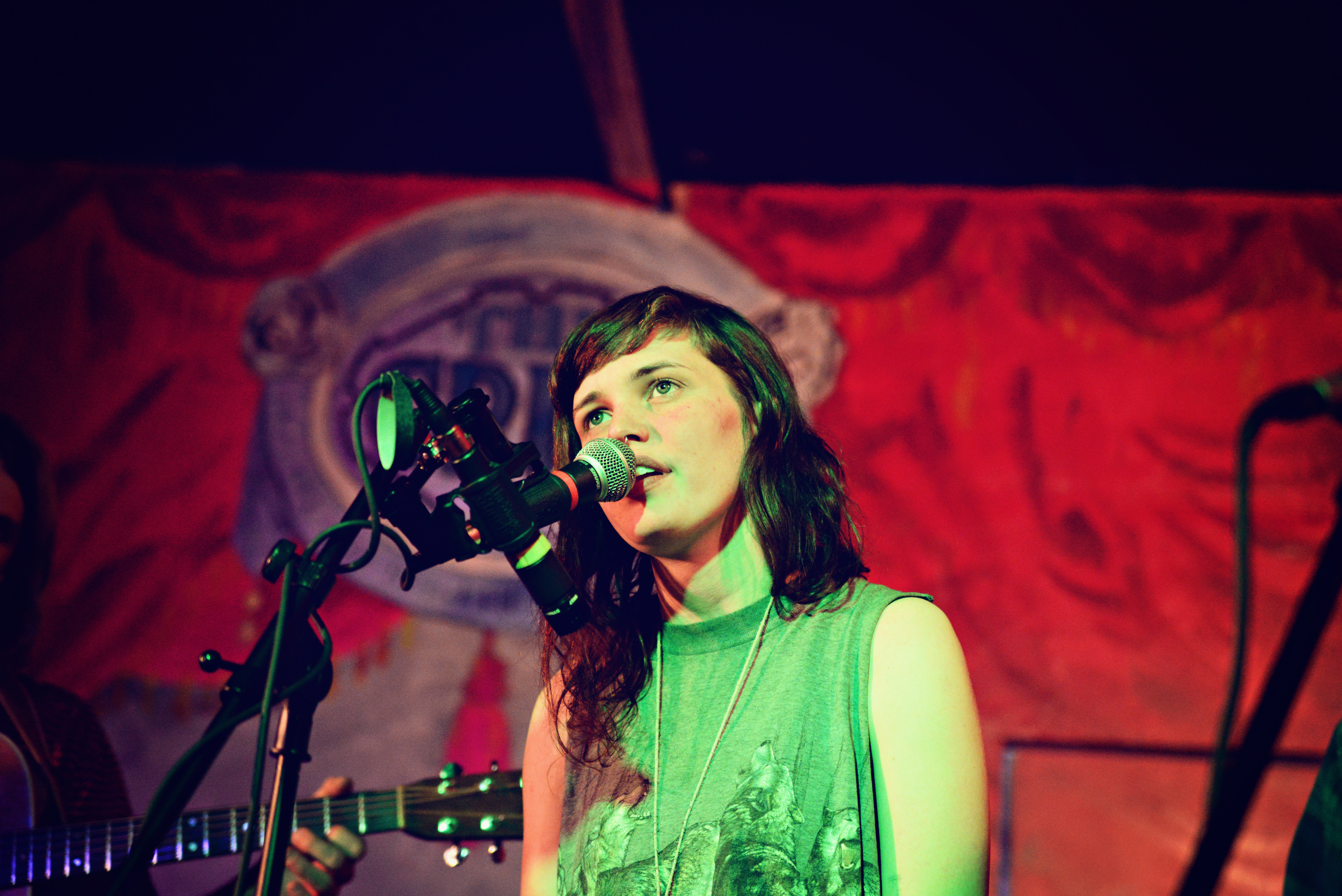
Maryn Jones performing with Saintseneca in 2014

This line-up continued to tour the Midwest and East Coast throughout 2010 and early 2011 while work began on their first full-length album, Last which was released by Mama Bird Recording Co. on August 16, 2011. The initial line-up amicably dissolved on August 31, 2011 after the album release show for Last in Columbus.

Since releasing their debut album, the band has brought Steve Ciolek (The Sidekicks), Maryn Jones (All Dogs), Jon Meador, and Matt O’Conke (also of Tin Armor) into the fold. The band signed to ANTI- records in the spring of 2013. After 10 months of home recording with Glenn Davis (of Way Yes) the band entered ARC Studios in Omaha, Nebraska to begin work with producer Mike Mogis on their second full-length album Dark Arc. The first single from that album, “Uppercutter”, was released on October 15, 2013. On April 1, 2014 Saintseneca released their second full-length album, Dark Arc.

On October 9, 2015 the band released their third album, Such Things. On December 9, 2016, the band released The Mallwalker EP. In 2017, the band released three digital singles, "Book Of The Dead On Sale", "Moon Barks At The Dog", and "Wandering Star". In anticipation of the August 31, 2018 album Pillar of Na, the song "Frostbiter" was released on June 19, 2018 and "Ladder to the Sun" was released on July 16 of the same year. Both were accompanied by music videos. NPR described Saintseneca as unexpected and innovative in a review following these releases.

Saintseneca released a new single "All You've Got Is Everyone" on February 3, 2021, through Anti Records. Zac Little described the song as: "I wanted to write a Christmas song, but it didn't feel right this time. So I thought about old new years and made a Valentine. I miss everyone, and I figure a song is kind of like a little tent. A place in space and time - you can pack it up and take it with you, get it out when you need it, and I like to imagine being together inside." In 2023 the band resume touring while continuing to work on new material together with Mike Mogis.

== Discography ==
Year	Title	Release	Label
2009	Saintseneca	EP	Paper Brigade
2010	Grey Flag	EP	Paper Brigade
2011	Last	LP	Mama Bird Recording Co.
2014	Dark Arc	LP	ANTI-
2015	Such Things	LP	ANTI-
2016	The Mallwalker	EP	ANTI-
2018	Pillar of Na	LP	ANTI-
2025	Highwalllow & Supermoon Songs	LP	Lame-O
