= The Exploding Hearts =

American punk rock and power pop band

- The Exploding Hearts. Left to right: Adam Cox, Jeremy Gage, Matt Fitzgerald, Terry Six

Background information
- Origin: Portland, Oregon, United States
- Genres: Punk rock, glam punk, power pop
- Years active: 2001–2003; 2023–present
- Labels: Vinyl Warning, Pelado, Screaming Apple, Dirtnap
- Members: Terry Six; Murat Aktürk; John Tyree; Chad Savage
- Past members: Adam Cox; Matt Fitzgerald; Jeremy Gage; King Louie Bankston; Jim Evans; Matt Bunza

The Exploding Hearts is an American punk rock and power pop band formed in Portland, Oregon, United States, in 2001. The band's principal lineup during their initial tenure was composed of lead vocalist and guitarist Adam Cox, bassist Matt Fitzgerald, guitarist Terry Six, and drummer Jeremy Gage.

Shortly after the release of their debut studio album, Guitar Romantic, Cox, Fitzgerald, and Gage were killed in a car accident on July 20, 2003, after which the band disbanded. In 2023, Six, the last surviving member of the band's principal lineup, began performing under the Exploding Hearts name with himself on lead vocals.

== History ==
The band rose to prominence in the US Pacific Northwest scene shortly after they formed in 2001. The band drew influences from early British punk bands such as Buzzcocks, The Clash, The Jam, The Boys and The Only Ones, and Irish band The Undertones, as well as power pop acts like Nick Lowe. Adam Cox invited New Orleans musician King Louie Bankston into the band's lineup after Cox heard Bankston's song "I'm a Pretender" during a telephone conversation. Cox and Bankston formed a songwriting partnership that would produce many of the songs that would appear on Guitar Romantic.

The Exploding Hearts led a revival of 1970s-era power pop and new wave in the Seattle and Portland area along with bands like The Briefs and the Epoxies on the then-Seattle-based Dirtnap Records. Their combination of punk rock and power pop influenced melodies and their energetic live shows brought them attention on the West Coast and from magazines such as Maximumrocknroll and Shredding Paper, which featured them on their covers. They released their debut studio album, Guitar Romantic, in April 2003. Bankston left the band shortly after the album was released.

=== July 2003 accident ===
On July 20, 2003, the band was headed home to Portland on Interstate 5 after having played at the Bottom of the Hill in San Francisco. It is believed that Fitzgerald, who was driving, fell asleep and lost control of their van near Eugene, Oregon. Cox, 23, and Gage, 21, were thrown from the vehicle and pronounced dead at the scene and Fitzgerald, 20, died at a hospital. Guitarist Terry Six, 21, and manager Rachell Ramos, 35, sustained only minor injuries. The band disbanded in the aftermath of the accident.

A compilation album was released by Dirtnap Records in 2006. In 2009, their song "Modern Kicks" was listed as the 290th greatest song of the decade, and their album Guitar Romantic deemed the 60th best album of the decade by Pitchfork Media.

=== Post-Exploding Hearts projects ===
Terry Six joined former members of the Portland-based band The Riffs, Gabe Lageson, Colin Jarrell, Alan Mansfield, and established the Portland-based power pop band, The Nice Boys. They released a 7" single on Discourage Records entitled "You Won't See Me Anymore" b/w "Lipstick Love" and a S/T full-length album on Birdman Records. Six and former Exploding Hearts member King Louie Bankston formed the duo Terry & Louie in the 2010s and released the album ...A Thousand Guitars in 2015. Bankston died on February 13, 2022.

=== Revival ===
In 2023, Six began to play Exploding Hearts material again live, with a lineup featuring himself on lead vocals and guitar, drummer John Tyree and bassist Chad Savage, who had played with Terry & Louie, and guitarist Murat Aktürk. Six's band played under the Exploding Hearts name at the Mosswood Meltdown festival in Oakland, California in July 2025.

== Members ==
=== Current members ===
- Terry Six – guitars (2001–2003; 2023–present) lead vocals (2023–present)
- Murat Aktürk – guitars (2023–present)
- John Tyree – drums, percussion (2023–present)
- Chad Savage – bass (2023–present)

=== Former members ===
- Adam Cox – lead vocals, guitars (2001–2003; his death)
- King Louie Bankston – keyboards (2001–2002; died 2022)
- Jim Evans – bass (2001–2002)
- Matt Bunza – drums (2001)
- Jeremy Gage – drums, percussion (2001–2003; his death)
- Matt Fitzgerald – bass (2002–2003; his death)

== Discography ==
=== Albums ===
- Guitar Romantic (CD/LP, 2003): Recorded at Studio 13 in April 2002 by Pat Kearns. Produced by Pat Kearns and The Exploding Hearts. The LP was released on Screaming Apple Records with an initial pressing of 1000. The CD was released on Dirtnap Records on March 24, 2003 with an initial pressing of 2300.
- Shattered (CD, 2006): This Dirtnap Records CD is a compilation of all of the Hearts' singles, including their unreleased final recordings. There is also a five-song video collection of live performances from the band's second to final show at the Bottom of the Hill in San Francisco.

=== Singles ===
- "(Making) Teenage Faces" (2002): Single release on Vinyl Warning Records with an initial press of 200 white and 300 black vinyl. The b-side is "Your Shadow". A second pressing of 500 on black vinyl was also made. The planned third pressing (which was to have a different cover) was canceled after the accident.
- "Modern Kicks" (2003): The single version is different from the version on the full-length album. The single was released on Pelado Records in a pressing of 700 black, 200 mixed colors. The b-side is "Busy Signals"
- " I'm a Pretender" (2003): Was also released on Pelado Records

=== Compilations ===
- Dirtnap Across the Northwest (2003): This Dirtnap Records label compilation featured The Exploding Hearts' cover of FU2's song "Sniffin' Glue."

=== Demos ===
- The Pink Demo (2002): Unreleased five song demo, recorded with engineer Pat Kearns.

Their song "Your Shadow" is featured in the EA skateboarding video game Skate.

== Filmography ==
A documentary film is currently in production and is scheduled for a future release.
