= Yowler =

American singer

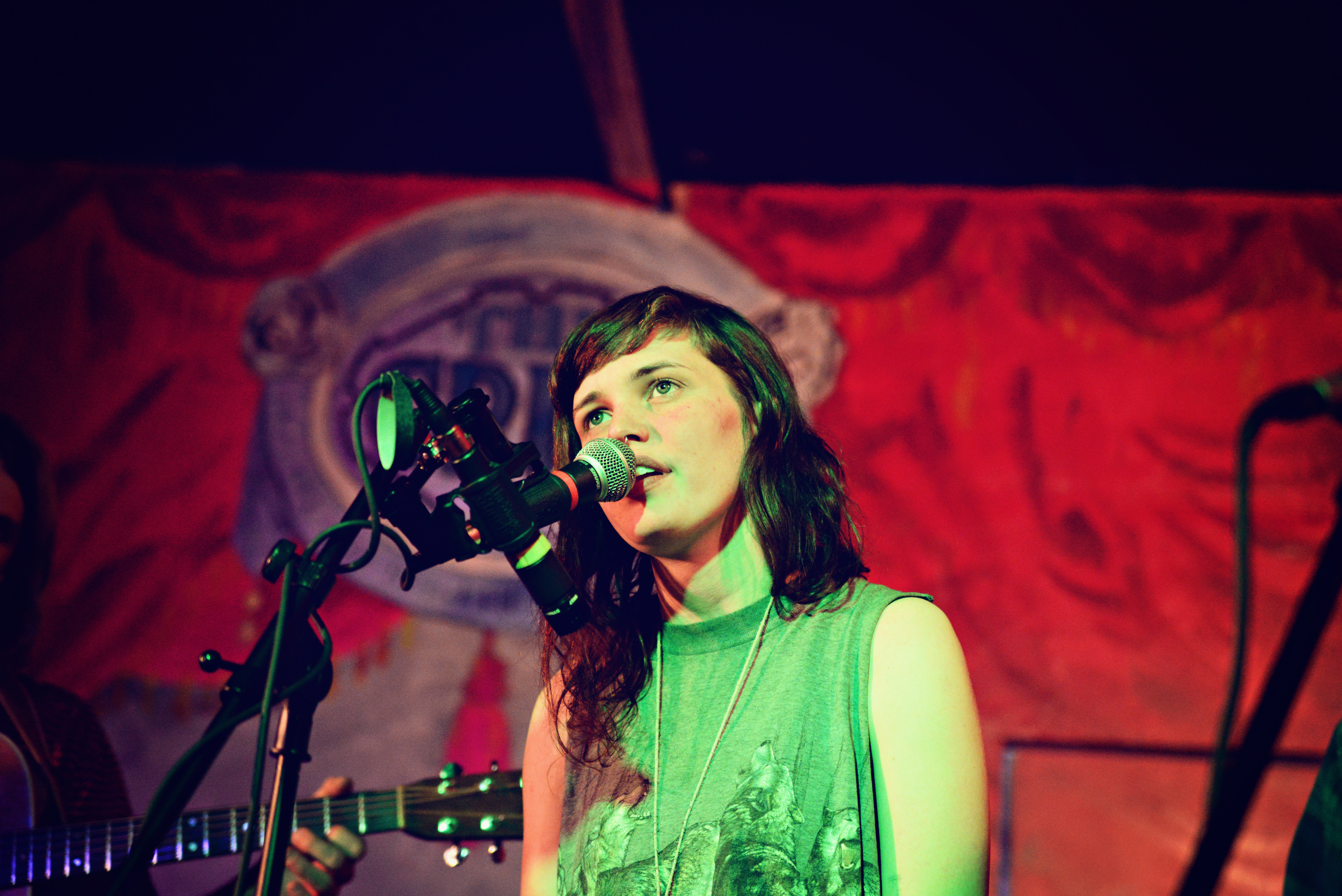
- Jones performing with Saintseneca in 2014.

Background information
- Also known as: Maryn Jones
- Origin: Philadelphia, Pennsylvania, US
- Genres: Folk; indie rock; pop punk
- Instruments: Guitar; vocals
- Years active: 2015–present
- Label: Double Double Whammy
- Member of: All Dogs
- Formerly of: Saintseneca
- Website: yowler.bandcamp.com

Maryn Jones, known by the stage name Yowler, is an American musician. Jones is the guitarist and lead vocalist of the band All Dogs and formerly a member of the band Saintseneca.

== History ==
Jones released their first album under the name Yowler in 2015, titled The Offer. In 2017, Jones released their second album as Yowler, Black Dog in My Path.

== Backing Band ==
- John Samuels – guitar, casio
- Chelsea Dirck – bass guitar
- Tony Richards – drums

== Discography ==
Studio albums

- The Offer (2015, Double Double Whammy)
- Black Dog in My Path (2018, Double Double Whammy)
