= Mini (documentary) =

- Michael "Mini" Cooper
- Directed by: Franc Roddam
- Produced by: Roger Mills
- Production company: BBC: Inside Story
- Distributed by: BBC
- Release date: 11 June 1975 (BBC Two)
- Running time: 45 minutes
- Country: United Kingdom
- Language: English

Mini is a 1975 documentary created by director Franc Roddam for the BBC Inside Stories series. It follows 11-year-old arsonist Michael "Mini" Cooper over three weeks in October 1974 during his time at the secure Aycliffe Assessment Centre in School Aycliffe.

== Content ==
Michael "Mini" Cooper (Note: The nickname is a reference both to the car Mini Cooper and Mini's diminutive size.) is an 11-year-old from Craghead, County Durham, who has twice committed arson; firstly at his church, and again at home while his father was asleep upstairs. Mini's father narrowly escaped the blaze by escaping onto the roof. There have also been several instances of theft and truancy, and Mini has frequently run away from home since the age of three. His parents, feeling unable to cope, have sent him to Aycliffe Assessment Centre, a secure facility where he is to be examined by psychiatrists and social workers.

The documentary shows Mini's conversations with the workers at the centre in October 1974, as well as discussions between his parents and social workers on the situation and their disciplinary beliefs. It also shows Mini interacting with his fellow patients, his three siblings, parents, social workers, and discussing religion with his parents after attending a service at their Catholic church. The conversations explore Mini's own understanding of his actions, the possible causes of his troubled behaviour, and touch on allegations of domestic abuse from his father, whom Mini accuses of beating him and assaulting his mother. The film ends with the decision not to release Mini back into public life, and raises the possibility of Mini being sent to a specialist facility in Essex, hundreds of miles away from the rest of his family, against his father's wishes.

== Production ==
Roddam was interested in creating a documentary about an assessment centre for troubled children and the methods they employed, as it was a little-known area of social care among the public. He decided on Aycliffe as he had grown up in the north-east of England. Cooper as a principal subject was suggested by the staff, due to his intelligence and the unusual nature of his misdeeds, and possibly their own confidence in treating him. The documentary was filmed across three weeks in October 1974.

== Reception ==
The film is described as having "provoked strong public reaction" and "shocked millions" when it was first broadcast. Critics praised Cooper as a sympathetic subject while suggesting that he was partly the victim of an uncaring system which was unduly focused on his negative qualities. Viewers "flooded" the BBC with letters. Director Sam Peckinpah contacted Roddam with concern for Cooper's welfare.

Director Roddam won the 1975 Critics Award for Mini.

In 2018 documentarian Louis Theroux named Mini as one of his favourite documentaries, praising its story development and cinematography.

== Aftermath ==
Cooper was not sent to the specialist facility in Essex, but remained in County Durham.

The series 40 Minutes created a 1985 follow-up documentary, Johnny Oddball, which follows Cooper after leaving psychiatric care at the age of 21.

Cooper credits Mini with providing his younger self a more positive outlet for his behaviour than starting fires, appreciating the rare sense of agency he was given in being its subject; he highlights that he didn't attempt arson for many years after its production. He became lifelong friends with director Franc Roddam during the filming of the documentary, and ran away from home to see Roddam on a number of occasions afterwards.

Cooper published an autobiography, Mini & Me, via Roddam's publishing house in 2013.

== Sources ==
- "Ava Astaire, Michael 'Mini' Cooper, Franc Roddam, Doug Allan, Ewan Clayton". Midweek. 18 September 2013. BBC. BBC Radio 4.
- "Final Chapter on the Past". The Northern Echo. 26 September 2013.
- "Johnny Oddball". 40 Minutes. 31 October 1985. BBC. BBC Two.
- "Louis Theroux: Docs That Made Me". Louis Theroux: Docs That Made Me. 18 July 2018. BBC.
- "Michael 'Mini' Cooper Interview". The Big Issue. 25 October 2013. Archived from the original on 5 April 2016.
- "Watching Brief: Michael Cooper". The Northern Echo. 29 October 2013.
- Cooke, Rachel (25 July 2018). "The best shows to stream on Netflix and BBC iPlayer this summer". The New Statesman.
- Glynn, Stephen (2014). Quadrophenia. Wallflower Press. p. 29. ISBN 9780231167413. "Roddam's twelve-part 'fly-on-the-wall' documentary series followed the everyday dealings of the Wilkins family of Reading and won both healthy viewing figures and the 1974 Critics Award. Roddam won the award again in 1975 for Mini"
- Green, Emily (4 August 1991). "Ordeal by Fire". Independent on Sunday.
- Malone, Mary (12 June 1975). "A Small Boy's Horrific Story". Daily Mirror.
- W., P. J. (12 June 1975). "No way out for Mini". Staffordshire Sentinel.
