= The Marked Men =

American punk rock band

- Origin: Denton, Texas, United States
- Genres: Punk rock, pop punk
- Years active: 2002–Present
- Labels: Mortville, Shit Sandwich, Rip Off, Dirtnap, Swami, No Idea, Nice & Neat, 540
- Members: Joe Ayoub; Jeff Burke; Mark Ryan; Mike Throneberry

The Marked Men is an American punk rock band from Denton, Texas, United States, composed of guitarists/vocalists Mark Ryan and Jeff Burke, bassist Joe Ayoub, and drummer Mike Throneberry. They have released four albums through Rip Off Records, Dirtnap Records, and Swami Records. Their most recent album, Ghosts, was released in 2009 through Dirtnap.

Prior to joining The Marked Men, the members had all performed in other Denton-area punk rock bands. Burke was a member of The Vomit Punx, The Rolemodels, and E-Class. Burke, Ryan, and Throneberry all performed together in the Reds. When their bassist Chris Pulliam moved to Japan, they added Ayoub to form The Marked Men. Each member is also concurrently active in other bands. Burke plays in The Chopsakis, The Potential Johns, Grave City (since 2014, with Ryan), and, since 2010, The Novice. The Novice has now become Radioactivity. Ryan and Throneberry play in High Tension Wires with former Reds bassist Pulliam and Riverboat Gamblers frontman Mike Wiebe, and Ayoub plays in The Gash and Low Culture. Mark Ryan has a solo project called Mind Spiders which has released five albums and several 7-inches. Jeff returned from Japan in August 2012 and will play one last show with his Japanese bandmates as The Novice at Chaos in Tejas 2013, having released just one 7-inch on Dirtnap Records.

The Marked Men, Mind Spiders, Low Culture, and The Novice all played Chaos in Tejas 2013 in Austin, Texas.

== Discography ==
=== Albums ===
- The Marked Men (2003)
- On the Outside (2004)
- Fix My Brain (2006)
- Ghosts (2009)

=== Singles ===
- "I Can't Be Good" (2003)
- "She Won't Know" / "Nothing's Changed" (2005)
- "Fortune" (2008)
- "The Other Side" (2010)

=== Splits ===
- 7" with Birthday Suits (2009)
- 7" with This is My Fist (2009)

=== Compilations ===
- On The Other Side (2018)
