= Jeff Zeigler =

- Genres: Indie rock, post-rock
- Instruments: Guitar, synthesizer
- Label: Thrill Jockey
- Member of: Arc in Round
- Website: www.uniformrecording.com

Jeff Zeigler is an American musician, record producer, and sound engineer from Philadelphia, Pennsylvania. His Philadelphia recording studio, Uniform Recording, has recorded albums by Kurt Vile, A Sunny Day in Glasgow, The War on Drugs, and many other artists. He has also been a member of multiple bands, including Arc in Round. He has often collaborated with fellow Philadelphia musician Mary Lattimore. His production credits include Allison Crutchfield's 2017 solo debut album Tourist in This Town. In 2016, he started his own record label, Soft Dystopia. Also that year, he released the first self-titled album by his project Valley Exit, whose other members include Josh Meakim (A Sunny Day in Glasgow), April Harkanson (Myrrias), and Steven Urgo (The War on Drugs).
