= Salinas Records =

Detroit, Michigan-based punk rock record label

- Founded: 2003
- Founder: Marco Reosti
- Genre: Punk rock
- Country of origin: U.S.
- Location: Detroit, Michigan
- Official website: www.salinasrecords.com

Salinas Records is a Detroit, Michigan-based punk rock record label established in 2003 by Marco Reosti. Reosti initially did not have any intentions to start a label, only aiming to release a 7-inch for his own band. He put the name of author John Steinbeck's hometown on the back cover, inadvertently providing a company name for future releases.

== Notable artists ==
- All Dogs
- The Ambulars
- Bonny Doon
- Delay
- Dyke Drama
- The Goodbye Party
- The Hadituptoheres
- Joyride!
- Martha
- The Measure (SA)
- P.S. Eliot
- Radiator Hospital
- Swearin'
