= Swearin' =

Philadelphia-based alternative rock band

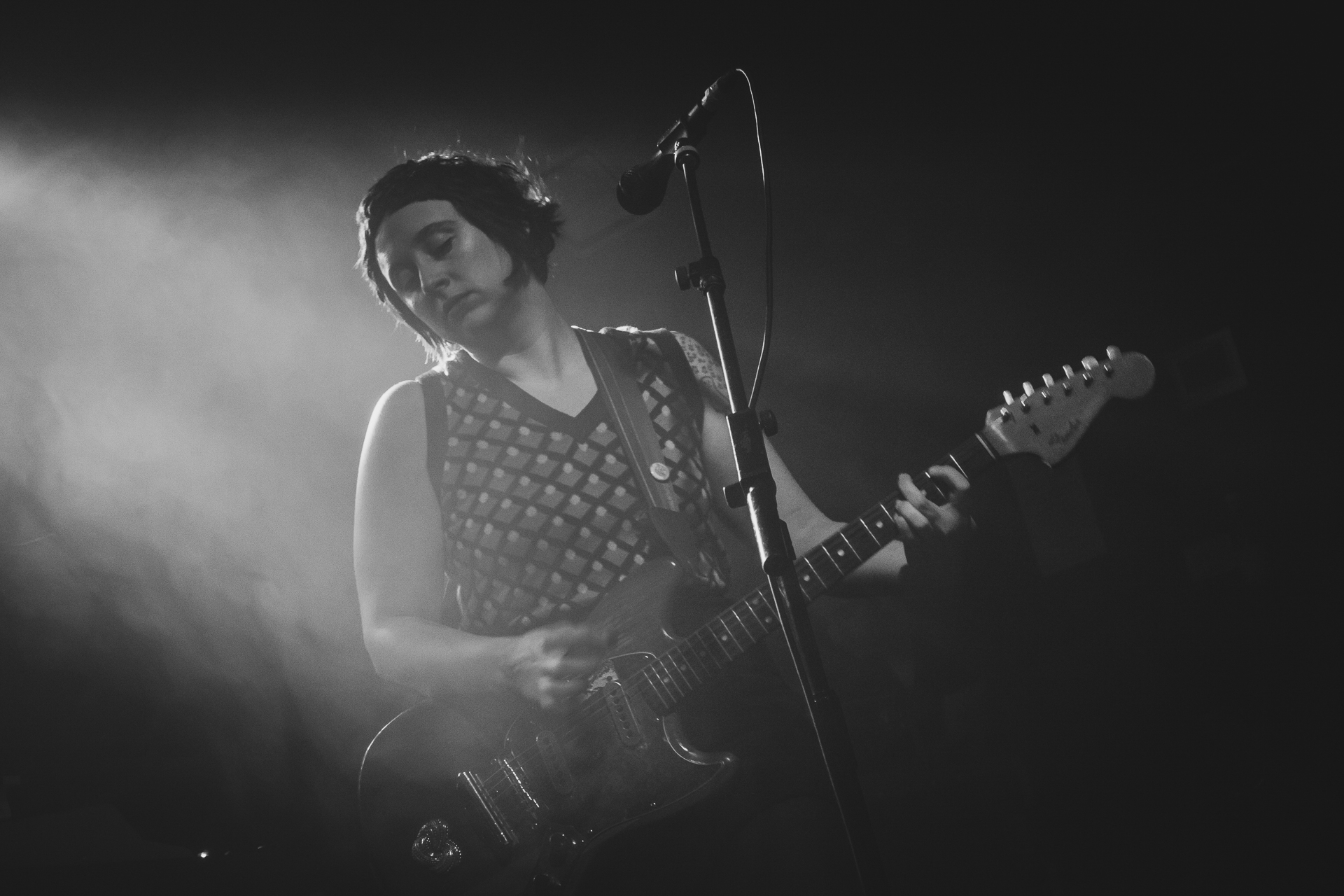
- Allison Crutchfield onstage, 2017

Background information
- Origin: Philadelphia, Pennsylvania, U.S.
- Genres: Indie rock, punk
- Years active: 2012–2015, 2017-present
- Labels: Salinas Records, Merge Records
- Members: Allison Crutchfield; Kyle Gilbride; Jeff Bolt; Amanda Bartley
- Past members: Keith Spencer

Swearin' is a Philadelphia-based musical group made up of singer/guitarist Allison Crutchfield, guitarist/singer Kyle Gilbride, bassist Keith Spencer and drummer Jeff Bolt. They released two albums and an EP. The band split in 2015 and Crutchfield embarked on a solo career. In November 2017, Swearin' announced that they had reunited and would go on tour in support of Superchunk in 2018.

== History ==
Born on January 4, 1989, Allison Crutchfield and her twin sister Katie Crutchfield formed their first musical group, the Ackleys, in their native Alabama in 2004. They recorded one self-titled album and an EP, Forget Forget, Derive Derive. After three years, they formed the band P.S. Eliot in 2007 and released two albums, Introverted Romance In Our Troubled Minds (2009), and Sadie (2011) both on Salinas Records. They disbanded in 2011, and Allison Crutchfield moved to New York where she formed Swearin' with Kyle Gilbride, previously of Big Soda. Katie Crutchfield remained in Alabama and performed solo under the name Waxahatchee. Both groups would often tour together.

Swearin' recorded a demo EP, What a Dump, in 2011. They released their debut album Swearin' on Salinas Records in 2012, followed by Surfing Strange in 2013. Salinas released What a Dump in 2014.

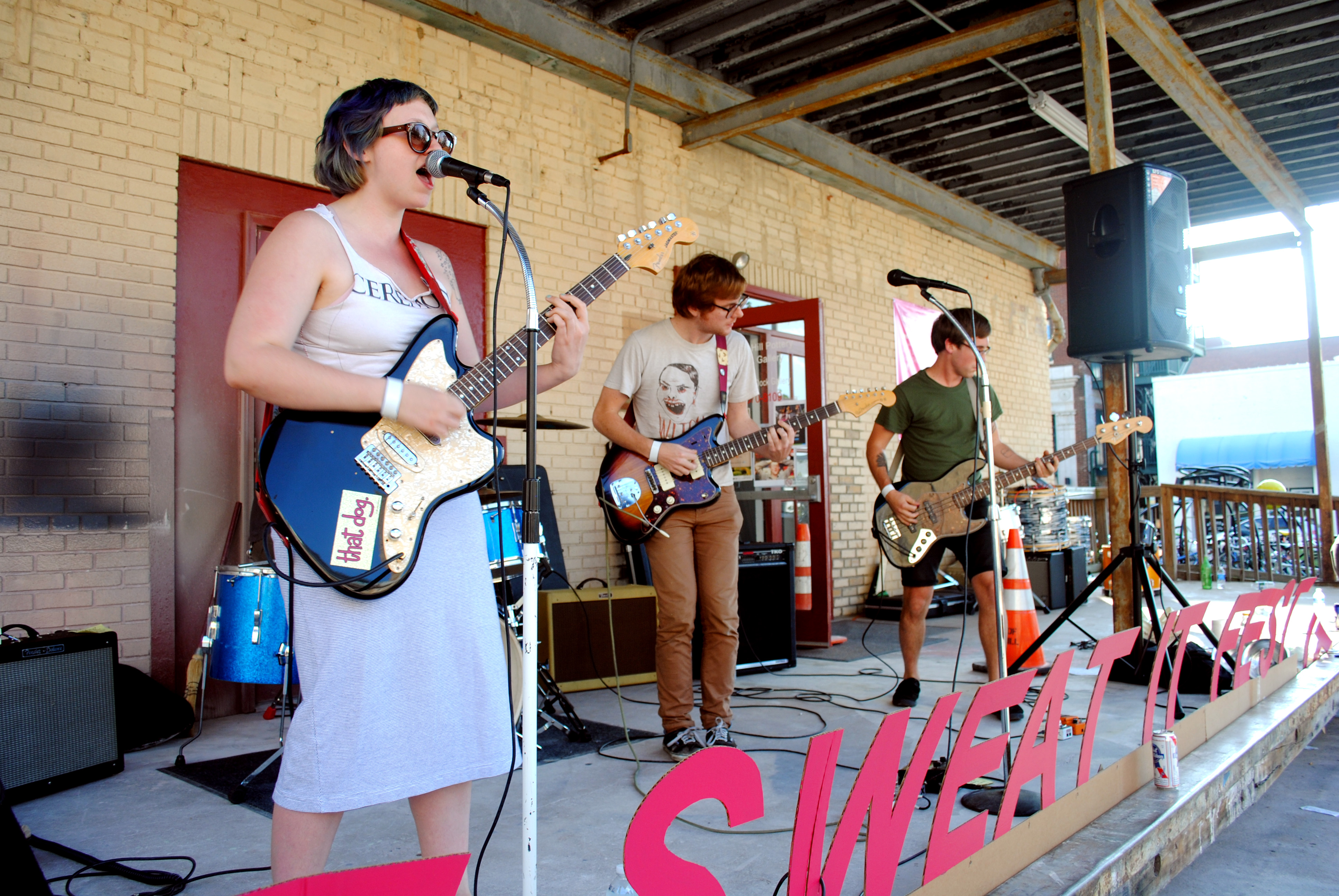
Swearin' Live At Sweat It Fest 2012

Band members Allison Crutchfield, Kyle Gilbride and Keith Spencer all contributed to Waxahatchee's second studio album, Cerulean Salt (2013).

In February 2015, Swearin' broke up, with band members Allison Crutchfield and Kyle Gilbride ending their relationship that same year. Crutchfield toured with her sister's band throughout the year while working on new material. She signed to Merge Records in July 2016 and embarked on a solo tour in October of that year.

In January 2017, Crutchfield released a solo album, Tourist in This Town, produced by Jeff Zeigler. She described the record as "visceral, and a huge part of me processing these changes that I was going through". The album was preceded by the single "I Don't Ever Wanna Leave California".

In July 2018, Swearin' announced their first new album in five years, Fall Into the Sun, would be released on Merge Records with single "Grow Into a Ghost". Released on October 5, 2018, Fall Into the Sun was received positively by critics, and featured on a list of the Top-50 albums of 2018 in The Skinny.

== Discography ==
- What a Dump - Salinas Records, 12" EP, MP3 (2011)
- Swearin' - Salinas Records, 12" LP, CD, MP3 (2012)
- Surfing Strange - Salinas Records, 12" LP, CD, MP3 (2013)
- Fall Into the Sun - Merge Records, 12" LP, CD, MP3 (2018)
