= Dirtnap Records =

Record label

- Founded: 1999
- Founder: Ken Cheppaikode
- Distributor: Revolver
- Genre: Punk rock
- Country of origin: United States
- Location: Milwaukee, Wisconsin
- Official website: www.dirtnaprecs.com

Dirtnap Records is an independent record label specializing in punk rock. It was founded by Ken Cheppaikode while he was living in Seattle, Washington, in 1999. He bought Green Noise record store in Portland, Oregon, in 2005 and then ran the label from there.

Cheppaikode started the label while working for Mordam Records, distributor of many punk labels and Maximumrocknroll magazine. Naturally, Mordam also distributed Dirtnap's early releases. However, immediately before Mordam merged with Lumberjack Distribution in 2005, Cheppaikode chose to switch to RedEye Distribution.

In 2006, Dirtnap agreed to an exclusive licensing deal with Railer Entertainment Music Licensing which immediately led to the inclusion of several Dirtnap bands on the soundtrack of the PlayStation 3 game, Skate.

Dirtnap originally focused on regional talent, releasing a number of local 7-inch singles and splits albums. It has since expanded its focus, attracting attention in the early 2000s when it was releasing records by The Briefs, the Epoxies, and The Exploding Hearts. In 2009, the label signed The White Wires from Ottawa. Other notable releases once Dirtnap expanded its focus include several records by groups such as The Marked Men from Denton, Texas and The Ergs! from New Brunswick, New Jersey.

In early 2007, Cheppaikode began a vinyl-only sub label called Green Noise, named after the record store, that retains the local focus Dirtnap used to have.

Other bands on the label include The Steve Adamyk Band, Martha (US only), Mind Spiders, Fox Face, The Hussy, and Sonic Avenues.

== See also ==
- List of record labels
