= AC Sapphire =

American indie folk singer-songwriter

- Also known as: Anna Christie; AnnaChristie Sapphire
- Born: Annachristie Marie Sadler; Downington, Pennsylvania
- Origin: Portland, Oregon
- Genres: Indie folk; Americana; desert rock; grunge
- Years active: 2005–present
- Label: Standard American Time
- Member of: AC Sapphire & the Shoulderpads; Caliko
- Formerly of: Sisters 3
- Website: acsapphiremusic.com

Annachristie Marie Sadler known professionally as AC Sapphire, is an American singer-songwriter based in Portland, Oregon. She has shared the stage with artists including First Aid Kit, Amos Lee, Langhorne Slim, and Victoria Williams and collaborated with Kyle Craft, Hoots & Hellmouth, Sharon Little, and Shirley Manson.

Raised in Eastern Pennsylvania, Sapphire performed from an early age and debuted with the self-released album Elixir for the Human Heart (2005). She formed the group Sisters 3 with her siblings Beatrice and Cassandra Sadler, which released two albums and found success in the Philadelphia music scene. After Sisters3 dissolved, Sapphire moved to the Mojave Desert and reestablished her solo career with the EP Sibling Rivalry (2015). She then relocated to Portland, where she released another EP, Omni Present (2020), and her long-delayed second album, Desert Car (2022).

== Early life ==
Born to Dennis and Cindy Sadler, Sapphire grew up in Downingtown, Pennsylvania, a suburb outside of Philadelphia. She is Jewish. She was one of eight siblings, all of whom were homeschooled. Their father, Dennis Sadler, was a fine art and antique dealer who managed Sapphire's early career and gave her her first guitars. Dennis was also a record collector who introduced the children to doo-wop and R&B artists, including The Ravens, The Harptones, The Chantels, The Drifters, The Platters, and The Flamingos. Through their homeschool program, Sapphire and her siblings were exposed to theatre and poetry. Sapphire first sang in a Shakespeare play at age 14, and she began writing songs at 15.

== Career ==
=== Early work and Sisters 3 (2005–2013) ===
Performing live by age 17, Sapphire (under the name Anna Christie) self-released her debut album, Elixir for the Human Heart, in January 2005; the album was produced by bluegrass musician Bob Harris and featured Travis Wetzel on violin, Richie Cole on alto saxophone, and Sapphire's sisters Beatrice and Cassandra Sadler singing harmonies. In 2011, she appeared solo with The Loom at Danger Danger Gallery, alongside Christopher Paul Stelling, Psalmships, and Former Belle.

While attending the Edinburgh Festival Fringe in Scotland in 2005, Sapphire, Beatrice, and Cassandra formed the group Sisters 3. The group recorded two studio albums, Star Spangled (2008) and Coruscate at the Meadow Gate (2011). The trio enjoyed regional success during their existence, touring with Philadelphia artists like Hoots & Hellmouth and Sharon Little, performing at Joy Rose's Mamapalooza and the Philadelphia Folk Festival, and appearing on NBC 10's The 10! Show. Sisters 3 ultimately dissolved in 2013, after one of the siblings left the group.

=== Move to California and Sibling Rivalry (2013–2020) ===
Amid the dissolution of Sisters 3, Sapphire launched the short-lived solo project Murchant in 2013, under which she toured locally, filmed a video of her busking at a G Line subway stop in Williamsburg, New York, and re-released several songs from Coruscate as well as a demo entitled "The Man", intended for an EP that did not materialize. Eventually, Sapphire left Pennsylvania in 2014 and traveled the country before settling in Joshua Tree, California, located in the Mojave Desert, having previously visited the town while working concessions for Coachella. She would spend five years living and meditating in the region, which influenced the direction of her music. A new EP, Sibling Rivalry, was self-released on March 12, 2015, promoted by the singles "Thunderbird" and the title track, the latter of which received a music video.

In January 2018, Sapphire released the single "Cut The Line", intended as the lead single for the upcoming album Desert Car. The song's music video premiered on May 9 via Folk Radio UK, who wrote of Sapphire "Her compelling songwriting style lends itself to an emotionally evocative experience for her listeners time and time again." Another single, "Bonsai", recorded with producer Tim Sonnefeld (Wanderlust, Iva), was released on November 9, followed by a music video in January 2019. The following December, Sapphire returned to Philadelphia for a show at Kung Fu Necktie with Barney Cortez and Pat Finnerty.

=== Omni Present and Desert Car (2020–present) ===
Sapphire moved again, this time to Portland, Oregon, where she recorded with Kyle Craft and volunteered as a vocal coach at the Rock and Roll Camp for Girls. In January 2020 she released the single "Mini Tour" via Audiofemme, simultaneously announcing a new EP entitled Omni Present and now officially billed as AC Sapphire. She also announced plans to tour in 2020, beginning with a March 12 show at Pappy & Harriet's in Pioneertown; the tour was to feature Lauren Ruth Ward and Valley Queen on select dates and would raise money for Rock and Roll Camp for Girls. On February 18, Sapphire released another single, "Desert Stars", with an accompanying music video. Refinery29 included the song in their list of "New Music To Know This Week", describing it as "a mystical vocal ride through a place of great danger and allure". Omni Present released on February 28 and premiered four days early via PopMatters, who wrote that the EP "never disappoints in its musical or emotional range."

In early March, Sapphire revealed that the previously announced album Desert Car was slated for release on May 8. The album's title track, written and produced with Tim Sonnefeld and featuring Victoria Williams on backing vocals, was simultaneously released as a single via American Songwriter. However, due to the COVID-19 pandemic, the album was delayed, being tentatively rescheduled for a summer release, and the planned tour was cancelled along with an album release show. Over the next two months, Sapphire released the singles "Stick & Poke Tattoo" and "Bag of Bones", as well as a music video for the latter edited from homemade footage, and streamed a virtual concert entitled "Quarantine Songs From My Bedroom" via Facebook. In June, to coincide with the George Floyd protests, Sapphire released the protest single "Police Brutality", originally written about the killing of Eric Garner, to Bandcamp. In December, she premiered the single "Thrift Store Score", featuring Particle Kid, via Glide Magazine.

Sapphire returned to Philadelphia in October to open for Christopher Paul Stelling at World Cafe Live, and the following month she and Nick Perri were featured on Sharon Little's cover of Radiohead's "High and Dry". In April and May 2022, "Stick & Poke Tattoo" and "Bonsai" were re-released as singles, with the latter receiving a music video, and Desert Car was finally released on July 16, 2022, via American Standard Time Records. In an interview the same month, Sapphire stated that she had no current touring plans but was looking for a booking agent to help schedule a sustainable tour.

In October, queercore group The HIRS Collective announced that their new compilation album, We're Still Here, would release on March 24, 2023, on Get Better Records, and that Sapphire would be featured on the title track alongside Shirley Manson of Garbage. Sapphire also said in November that she had formed a new backing band, AC Sapphire & The Shoulderpads, who had won Relix magazine's "Sonic Showdown Contest" and were planning to record a new album the following winter or spring. In December, she and fellow musician Kendall Lujan formed the duo Caliko and played their first show together at Portland's Mississippi Studios the following February. She was announced to perform both solo and with Caliko at the 2023 Treefort Music Fest in Boise, Idaho.

== Artistry ==
AC Sapphire's music draws from folk rock, desert rock, Americana, country, pop, grunge, and punk. Her expressive and wide-ranging vocals have been compared to Neko Case, Sally Oldfield, Susan Osborn, Annie Haslam, Sarah McLachlan, Cat Power, and Lydia Loveless. For her part, Sapphire has cited influences including Jeff Buckley, Stevie Wonder, Nina Simone, Neko Case, Joni Mitchell, Aretha Franklin, Angel Olsen, Buffy Sainte-Marie, Tom Petty, Frank Ocean, The Clash, Lucinda Williams, and Lou Reed. Early in her career, Sapphire counted Judy Garland and Ani DiFranco among her influences; her debut album, Elixir for the Human Heart, was described as having a "bluesy film noir flavor" and being "filled with mystery and longing as well as vocal and instrumental interplay." With Sisters 3, she primarily occupied the indie folk genre, with music that ranged from "driving indie rock to pure pop" and drew Sapphire comparisons to Neko Case, Feist, Joni Mitchell, and Karen O.

Sapphire's solo music was shaped by her move to the Mojave Desert and developed a more ethereal quality. On her 2020 EP Omni Present, opener "Red Sands" "marries the vast expanses of Neko Case with the stomping fire of early Velvet Underground", "Mini Tour" features a lo-fi sound reminiscent of Liz Phair and the Violent Femmes that "brings to mind an Astro van full of guitars heading full speed across the sand", and "Pictures of Yourself" and "Thirsty Willow" emphasize a rock sound. Desert Car, meanwhile, exhibits a California-inflected blend of pop, folk, and Americana, among other genres and influences. "Cut The Line" pairs the melancholy 1990s sound of Jeff Buckley and Smashing Pumpkins with a brighter chorus derived from 1950s doo-wop, creating a nostalgic sound that evokes The Shangri-Las, Spanish music, and the films of David Lynch. "Bonsai" features near-operatic vocals, rhythmic picking, atmospheric drones, and growling electric guitars; Sapphire created the song's echoing sound on a vintage Sunn spring reverb mixer and intended the melody to evoke whale calls. Other album tracks draw from 1960s girl groups ("Stick & Poke Tattoo"), classical ("Can You Feel What I Feel"), country ("35mm Camera"), and '70s punk/new wave a la Television, Blondie, Patti Smith, and Joan Jett ("Bag of Bones", "Thrift Store Score").

Lyrically, Sapphire's songs are often autobiographical, drawn from her experiences and nomadic lifestyle and often dealing with relationships and nostalgia. "Mini Tour" describes her first tour with Sisters3 and a breakup she experienced during it, while "Desert Stars" was written about a deceased friend. Desert Car and its title track were inspired by Sapphire's move to Joshua Tree, during which her car broke down in the desert and she purchased a 1992 Buick Roadmaster station wagon via Craigslist, which she saw as "marking a transformative time" in her life. "Stick & Poke Tattoo" is a love song based on Sapphire's brief affair with a blacksmith in Ireland who gave her the titular tattoo, while "Thrift Store Score" reflects her love of thrift shopping and "Bag of Bones" describes her life of travel. "Bonsai", inspired by a dream Sapphire had about "meeting different muses in the desert that were helping me get married to myself", uses this imagery to express a desire for real love in the face of a failed relationship.

== Personal life ==
Sapphire practiced meditation while living in the Mojave Desert, a practice that her song "Mini Tour" makes lyrical reference to. In April 2020, she noted while discussing the MeToo movement that "these topics are pertinent [to] issues in my life that I have been untangling for the past few years" and that her "eyes have been opening to a Reality that I have been trying to ignore my whole life" in light of the movement.

During a pandemic-induced break from touring in 2020, Sapphire obtained a long-delayed high school diploma and enrolled at Portland Community College to study filmmaking. She used this experience to direct her "Stick & Poke Tattoo" music video, and expressed a desire in 2022 to direct videos for other artists.

=== Advocacy and politics ===
Sapphire has supported a number of progressive social and political causes during her career, including women's rights, indigenous rights, same-sex marriage, opposition to police brutality, the rights of immigrants and refugees, and transgender rights. Since relocating to Portland, she has been involved with the non-profit Rock and Roll Camp for Girls as a volunteer vocal coach and 10% of proceeds from her Omni Present EP were donated to the organization.

Sapphire endorsed Bernie Sanders in the 2016 Democratic primaries, then Green Party candidate Jill Stein in the general election. She endorsed Sanders again in 2020, citing his positions on healthcare and education and her belief that Joe Biden would not be able to defeat Donald Trump, but ultimately encouraged fans to vote in the general election and expressed relief and optimism following Biden's eventual victory over Trump.

Sapphire performed at a May 2017 rally on behalf of the Mojave Desert Land Trust, and in June 2019 she joined a benefit concert for the Immigration and Refugee Community Organization. During the Supreme Court nomination of Brett Kavanaugh in September 2018, Sapphire spoke up about rape culture, condemning Kavanaugh and supporting his accuser Dr. Christine Blasey Ford. In December 2018, Sapphire echoed fellow musician Chris Kasper's suggestion that streaming services like Spotify should introduce a virtual tip jar for artists, similar to what Uber and Lyft had done for their drivers. In February 2021, proceeds from her single "Thrift Store Score" were donated to the Prison Reform Initiative and the Water Protectors Legal Collective.

In September 2022, Sapphire voiced support for the Mahsa Amini protests in Iran, announcing that proceeds from a recent recording by her band would be donated to the non-profit United4Iran.

== Discography ==
=== Solo ===
==== Studio album ====
- Elixir for the Human Heart (as Anna Christie) (2005; Lothworth)
- Desert Car (2022; American Standard Time)
- Dec. 32nd (2024; American Standard Time)

===== With Sisters 3 =====
- Star Spangled (2008)
- Coruscate at the Meadow Gate (2011)

==== EPs ====
- Sibling Rivalry (as AnnaChristie) (2015; independent)
- Omni Present (2020; GrindEthos Records)

==== Singles ====
Year	Title	Album	Label	Ref
2015	"Thunderbird"	Sibling Rivalry	Independent	
2016	"Sibling Rivalry"	Sibling Rivalry	Independent	
2018	"Cut The Line"	Desert Car	Independent	
2018	"Picture of Yourself"	Omni Present	Independent	
2018	"Bonsai"	Desert Car	Independent	
2020	"Mini Tour"	Omni Present	GrindEthos	
2020	"Desert Stars"	Omni Present	GrindEthos	
2020	"Desert Car"	Desert Car	Independent	
2020	"Bag of Bones"	Desert Car	Independent	
2020	"Stick & Poke Tattoo"	Desert Car	American Standard Time	
2020	"Police Brutality"	non-album single	Independent	
2020	"Thrift Store Score" (ft. Particle Kid)	Desert Car	GrindEthos/Dog Yard	
2022	"Bonsai" (re-release)	Desert Car	American Standard Time	
2022	"Stick & Poke Tattoo" (re-release)	Desert Car	American Standard Time	
2022	"Jesus Are You There?"	Desert Car	American Standard Time	
2024	"Chaparral Bottoms"	Dec. 32nd	American Standard Time	
2024	"Weed Money"	Dec. 32nd	American Standard Time	
2024	"Sibling Rivalry"	Dec. 32nd	American Standard Time	

==== Music videos ====
Year	Song	Director	Ref
2015	"Sibling Rivalry"	Caitlin Denny	
2016	"Thunderbird"	Tomasz Thomson	
2018	"Cut The Line"	Evan Cutler Wattles & Joshua Davitz	
2018	"Picture of Yourself"	Stephen B. Brock & Andrew Malcolm	
2019	"Bonsai"	Casey Kiernan	
2020	"Desert Stars"	Panda Landa	
2020	"Bag of Bones"	Dani Mari	
2022	"Stick & Poke Tattoo"	Annachristie Sadler	
2024	"Automated Advertisement"	Annachristie Sadler	
2024	"Weed Money"	Tyler Beus	

==== Featured on ====
- 2021: Sharon Little, "High and Dry" (ft.Nick Perri and AC Sapphire)
- 2023: The HIRS Collective, "We're Still Here" (ft. Shirley Manson and AC Sapphire)
