= Sisters 3 =

American indie folk musical group

- Also known as: The Sapphires, The Sisters Three
- Origin: Philadelphia, Pennsylvania, U.S.
- Genres: Indie folk
- Years active: 2005–2013
- Labels: Vibewrangler, Modern Vintage
- Past members: Annachristie Sadler; Cassandra Sadler; Beatrice Sadler

Sisters 3 was an American indie folk group from Philadelphia, Pennsylvania, formed in 2005 by siblings Annachristie, Beatrice, and Cassandra Sadler. The group released two albums, Star Spangled (2008) and Coruscate at the Meadow Gate (2011), and found local notoriety, collaborating with artists including Hoots & Hellmouth, Sharon Little, and American Babies, and performing at the Philadelphia Folk Festival and venues including the Mann Center and Madison Square Garden. Annachristie Sadler would later find more notoriety as a solo artist under the name AC Sapphire.

== History ==
=== Origins (2005–2008) ===
The Sadlers were among eight children born to Dennis and Cindy Sadler and grew up in Downingtown, Pennsylvania. The Sadler children were homeschooled and exposed to Shakespearean theatre and poetry, which led Annachristie to write her first song at age 15. Dennis Saddler, a fine art and antique dealer and record collector, gave Annachristie her first guitar and introduced the children to doo-wop and R&B artists like The Ravens, The Harptones, The Chantels, The Drifters, The Platters, and The Flamingos. Annachristie, Beatrice, and Cassandra performed together for their family from a young age.

Prior to the group's formation, a 20-year-old Annachristie released a solo album, Elixir for the Human Heart, in early January 2005, with Beatrice and Cassandra providing backing harmonies on the album. Additionally, Cassandra was a classical composer and Beatrice had been a vocalist in the band Naughty Naughty Nurses. Later that month, the siblings, billed as the Sisters Three, performed at the Singer-Songwriter Conspiracy showcase in Sellersville (organized by Dennis Sadler), where they appeared alongside the Travis Wetzel Trio, John Francis, Hoots & Hellmouth, and Sharon Little. They officially formed the group later that year while attending the Edinburgh Festival Fringe in Scotland, initially under the name The Sapphires, and soon after embarked on a mini-tour with local Philadelphia bands including The Extraordinaires. They also provided backing vocals on Hoots & Hellmouth's 2007 self-titled debut album for MAD Dragon Records and subsequent tour, and for Sharon Little on her 2008 tour with Robert Plant and Alison Krauss.

=== Career (2008–2013) ===
Sisters 3 recorded their debut album, Star Spangled, in Hamilton, Ontario, Canada with producer Glen Marshall (Broken Social Scene, Feist, Kaki King) and his partner Michael Keire, in the same church where Feist's early albums were recorded; Marshall told CMJ regarding Annachristie's vocals that "the only other time I have experienced those kind of goosebumps was recording Feist." The album was released on February 29, 2008 through Marshall's Vibewrangler label. That same year, the band appeared on NBC 10's The 10! Show and performed at Joy Rose's Mamapalooza and at the Philadelphia Folk Festival, the latter alongside Espers, Craig Bickhardt, Ursula Rucker, Tin Bird Choir, and Matt Duke.

In early 2011, Sisters 3 contributed vocals to Hezekiah Jones' album Have You Seen Our Fort for Yer Bird Records and to American Babies' Flawed Logic for Engine Room Recordings. Additionally, Annachristie appeared solo with The Loom at Danger Danger Gallery alongside Christopher Paul Stelling, Psalmships, and Former Belle. The band's second album, Coruscate at the Meadow Gate, was released on June 7, 2011 via Modern Vintage Recordings; the album was co-produced by Eshy Gazit and engineered by The Boils's Mike Bardzik, and was partially recorded at The Cutting Room Studios in Manhattan. A music video for the song "Wolfmother" was released in October. The group also received radio play on WXPN, alongside artists like The War on Drugs, Purling Hiss, Work Drugs, Hop Along, and Gene Ween.

Sisters 3 dissolved around 2013, after one of the sisters left the group. Following the group's end, Annachristie launched a short-lived solo project, Murchant, before eventually finding greater solo success under the name AC Sapphire.

== Musical style ==
Sisters3 was primarily identified during their existence as folk, indie folk, indie pop, and country, a sound described by Cassandra Sadler as "mutant folk music", and were known for their three-part vocal harmonies. Influences cited by the group included Erik Satie, Frédéric Chopin, Ramones, Minor Threat, Jeff Buckley, Patsy Cline, The Shirelles, The Ravens, Lead Belly, and grunge music. Kiley Bense of WXPN described the group's music as "driving, rollicking songs with lyrics and vocals that recall Neko Case at her rootsiest." Debut album Star Spangled incorporated synthesizer and elements of soul and girl group music into their folk sound. The group's second album, Coruscate at the Meadow Gate, showcased a more eclectic style, utilizing instruments like piano and ukulele and incorporating elements of alternative and indie rock, pop, classical, jazz, 1950s doo-wop, and garage rock. Reviewing Coruscate, Jeremy Lukens of Glide Magazine distinguished the group from "the folk pop revival trend of recent years" and noted that the album "transcends conventions of genre and traditional song structures, instead favoring capturing the raw emotion of the material. Discordant melodies and dynamic shifts provide an underlying tension, but each fragmented image and feeling is bound by the distinct vocal harmonies of the close-knit sisters." The Philadelphia City Paper similarly noted that "[the group] can get away with a lot of weird stuff because of how beautiful their voices sound in combination."

== Members ==
- Annachristie Sadler – lead vocals, guitar
- Cassandra Sadler – vocals, piano, synthesizer
- Beatrice Sadler – vocals, percussion

== Discography ==
=== Studio albums ===
- Star Spangled (2008; Vibewrangler)
- Coruscate at the Meadow Gate (2011; Modern Vintage Recordings)

=== Singles ===
Year	Title	Album	Ref
2011	"Pleased To Meet You"	Coruscate at the Meadow Gate	
2011	"Pleiades"	Coruscate at the Meadow Gate	
2011	"Wolfmother"	Coruscate at the Meadow Gate	

=== Music videos ===
- "Wolfmother" (2011)

=== Compilation appearances ===
- Philly Comp One: How To Make An Arrow (2010) – "Star Spangled"

=== Featured on ===
- Hoots & Hellmouth, Hoots & Hellmouth (2007; MAD Dragon) – vocals
- American Babies, Flawed Logic (2011; Engine Room) – backing vocals
- Sharon Little, Follow that Sound, Perfect Time For A Breakdown (2008 CBS) - vocals, arrangement.
