= Omni Present =

EP by AC Sapphire
- Released: February 28, 2020
- Genre: Indie pop, folk rock
- Length: 25:06
- Label: GrindEthos
- Producer: Matt Adams, Harlan Steinberger

AC Sapphire chronology
Sibling Rivalry (2015)	Omni Present (2020)	Desert Car (2022)

Singles from Omni Present
- 1. "Picture of Yourself" Released: September 7, 2018; 2. "Mini Tour" Released: January 16, 2020; 3. "Desert Stars" Released: February 18, 2020

Omni Present is the second studio EP by American singer-songwriter AC Sapphire (and her first recording under that name), released on February 28, 2020 through GrindEthos Records.

== Background and recording ==
Early in her career, Sapphire recorded a solo album under the name Anna Christie, as well as two albums with her sisters as the indie folk trio Sisters 3. Amid that group's dissolution in 2014, Sapphire relocated to the town of Joshua Tree, California in the Mojave Desert, where she recorded the EP Sibling Rivalry as AnnaChristie in 2015. Sapphire then moved again to Portland, Oregon, and in early 2020, now officially billed as AC Sapphire, she announced the EP's forthcoming release.

Omni Present was produced by Matt Adams at Arroyo Seco Studio and Harlan Steinberger at Hen House Studios in Venice, California. It was mixed and mastered by Robert Harder at On The Rocks Studios in Joshua Tree and Mike Coykendal at Blue Room Studios in Portland.

== Composition ==
Sapphire's solo music was shaped by her move to the Mojave Desert and developed a more ethereal quality. On the EP, opener "Red Sands" "marries the vast expanses of Neko Case with the stomping fire of early Velvet Underground", "Mini Tour" features a lo-fi sound reminiscent of Liz Phair and the Violent Femmes that "brings to mind an Astro van full of guitars heading full speed across the sand", and "Pictures of Yourself" and "Thirsty Willow" emphasize a rock sound. Lyrically, "Mini Tour" describes her first tour with Sisters3 and a breakup she experienced during it, while "Desert Stars" was written about a deceased friend.

== Release and promotion ==
"Picture of Yourself" was originally released as a standalone single on September 7, 2018. The EP was officially announced in January 2020, and the lead single "Mini Tour" simultaneously premiered via the website Audiofemme. A second single, "Desert Stars", was released on February 18 with an accompanying music video. The EP was released on February 28, 2020 by GrindEthos Records, with an early premiere via PopMatters. Sapphire donated 10% of the record's proceeds to the Rock and Roll Camp for Girls, where she had volunteered as a vocal coach.

== Reception ==
Omni Present received positive attention from blogs and media outlets. PopMatters wrote that the record "never disappoints in its musical or emotional range." Refinery29 included "Desert Stars" in their list of "New Music To Know This Week", with Courtney E. Smith describing it as "a mystical vocal ride through a place of great danger and allure". Nick Smithson of Review Graveyard gave the record a score of 8, calling it "a wonderful release" and writing that "Sapphire's ability to craft beautiful songs is perfectly matched by her hauntingly spot on delivery." Tom Haugen of Take Effect similarly gave the EP an 8/10 score, calling it "as colorful as the cover art" and a "playful and adventurous effort" and comparing it sonically to Jeff Buckley, Neko Case, and Post Animal.

== Track listing ==
No.	Title	Length
1.	"Red Sands"	04:24
2.	"Rock and Roll Van"	03:38
3.	"Mini Tour"	04:35
4.	"Picture of Yourself"	03:42
5.	"Thirsty Willow"	04:07
6.	"Desert Stars"	04:37
Total length:		25:06

== Personnel ==
- AC Sapphire – main artist
- Matt Adams – producer, bass, artwork
- Harlan Steinberger – producer
- Robert Harder – mixing, mastering, various instruments
- Mike Coykendall – mixing, mastering
- Ryan Erskine – drums
- Carly Valentine – photos
