= Desert Car =

2022 studio album by AC Sapphire

Studio album by AC Sapphire
- Released: July 16, 2022
- Genre: Indie folk, Americana
- Length: 41:38
- Label: American Standard Time
- Producer: Tim Sonnenfeld; AC Sapphire

AC Sapphire chronology
| Omni Present (2020) | Desert Car (2022) | Dec. 32nd (2024) |

Singles from Desert Car
- 1. "Cut the Line" Released: January 17, 2018; 2. "Bonsai" Released: November 9, 2018; 3. "Desert Car" Released: March 12, 2020; 4. "Bag of Bones" Released: April 17, 2020; 5. "Stick and Poke Tattoo" Released: April 19, 2020; 6. "Thrift Store Score" Released: December 17, 2020; 7. "Stick and Poke Tattoo (re-release)" Released: April 19, 2022; 8. "Bonsai (re-release)" Released: May 27, 2022; 9. "Jesus Are You There?" Released: July 8, 2022

Desert Car is the second studio album by American singer-songwriter AC Sapphire (and first under that name), released on July 16, 2022 through American Standard Time Records. Initially announced in early 2018, the album experienced several delays, in part due to the COVID-19 pandemic. It features contributions from Particle Kid and Victoria Williams.

== Background ==
Born Annachristie Sadler and active in music from a young age, Sapphire recorded her first album, Elixir for the Human Heart (2005), under the name Anna Christie while still a teenager. She then recorded two albums with her sisters, Beatrice and Cassandra Sadler, as Sisters 3, who saw local success in Philadelphia before dissolving in 2013. After the breakup, Sadler relocated first to Joshua Tree, California, then to Portland, Oregon, gradually reestablishing her solo career under the name AC Sapphire. Her 2020 EP, Omni Present, was her first release using that name.

== Recording and composition ==
According to the album's liner notes, tracks were recorded with producers Tim Sonnenfeld, Johnny Hanson, Harlan Steinberger, Lynx DeMuth, Howard Billerman, and Sapphire herself at studios including The Nest Studios, Hen House Studios in Venice, California, and at Victoria Williams' studio. Sapphire created the echoing sound of "Bonsai" on a vintage Sunn spring reverb mixer, intending the melody to evoke whale calls.

Desert Car exhibits a California-inflected blend of pop, folk, and Americana, among other genres and influences. "Cut The Line" pairs the melancholy 1990s sound of Jeff Buckley and Smashing Pumpkins with a brighter chorus derived from 1950s doo-wop, creating a nostalgic sound that evokes The Shangri-Las, Spanish music, and the films of David Lynch. "Bonsai" features near-operatic vocals, rhythmic picking, atmospheric drones, and growling electric guitars. Other album tracks draw from 1960s girl groups ("Stick & Poke Tattoo"), classical ("Can You Feel What I Feel"), country ("35mm Camera"), and '70s punk/new wave a la Television, Blondie, Patti Smith, and Joan Jett ("Bag of Bones", "Thrift Store Score").

Lyrically, the album and its title track were inspired by Sapphire's move to Joshua Tree, during which her car broke down in the desert and she purchased a 1992 Buick Roadmaster station wagon via Craigslist, which she saw as "marking a transformative time" in her life. "Stick & Poke Tattoo" is a love song based on Sapphire's brief affair with a blacksmith in Ireland who gave her the titular tattoo, while "Thrift Store Score" reflects her love of thrift shopping and "Bag of Bones" describes her life of travel. "Bonsai", inspired by a dream Sapphire had about "meeting different muses in the desert that were helping me get married to myself", uses this imagery to express a desire for real love in the face of a failed relationship.

== Release and promotion ==
The album saw a staggered and much-delayed release. Sapphire, then using the name Annachristie Sapphire, first teased the album in January 2018, with "Cut the Line" released as the intended lead single. Another single, "Bonsai", was released the following November. In early March 2020, following Omni Present, Sapphire announced that the album would be released on May 8, 2020, and concurrently issued the title track as a new single via American Songwriter. However, due to the COVID-19 pandemic, the album was delayed, being tentatively rescheduled for a summer release, and the planned tour was cancelled along with an album release show. Over the next two months, Sapphire released the singles "Stick & Poke Tattoo" and "Bag of Bones", as well as a music video for the latter edited from homemade footage, and streamed a virtual concert entitled "Quarantine Songs From My Bedroom" via Facebook. In December, she premiered the single "Thrift Store Score", featuring Particle Kid, via Glide Magazine.

In April and May 2022, "Stick & Poke Tattoo" and "Bonsai" were re-released as singles, with the latter receiving a music video, and Desert Car was finally released on July 16, 2022, via American Standard Time Records. In an interview the same month, Sapphire stated that she had no current touring plans but was looking for a booking agent to help schedule a sustainable tour.

== Reception ==
John Apice of Americana Highways called the album "genuinely long-awaited" and praised its "absorbing Americana sprinkled with doses of ethereally ambitious soundscapes".

== Track listing ==
All tracks are written by AC Sapphire except where noted.

| No. | Title | Writer(s) | Length |
|---|---|---|---|
| 1. | "Stick and Poke Tattoo" | | 3:26 |
| 2. | "Jesus Are You There?" | | 3:11 |
| 3. | "Desert Car" | AC Sapphire, Tim Sonnenfeld | 3:54 |
| 4. | "Bag of Bones" | | 3:16 |
| 5. | "Bonsai" | | 3:39 |
| 6. | "Mood Ring" | | 4:23 |
| 7. | "Thrift Store Score" (feat. Particle Kid) | | 4:35 |
| 8. | "Cut the Line" | AC Sapphire, Tim Sonnenfeld, Victoria Williams | 4:01 |
| 9. | "Thirty Five Millimeter Camera" | | 4:11 |
| 10. | "Can You Feel What I Feel" | | 3:09 |
| 11. | "Full Moon" | AC Sapphire, Johnny Hanson | 3:48 |
| Total length: | | | 41:38 |

== Personnel ==
Adapted from Bandcamp:

=== Musicians ===
- AC Sapphire – main artist, guitar, vocals
- Ryan Erskine – drums, vocals
- Luke Dawson – pedal steel
- Victoria Williams – backup vocals
- Harlan Steinberger – drums (tracks 7, 9), organ (track 9)
- Aroyn Davis – bass guitar (tracks 7, 9)
- Nikita Sorokin – violin (track 9)
- Milo Gonzalez – electric guitar (track 9)
- Micah Nelson (aka Particle Kid) – featured artist, additional vocals, electric guitar (track 7)
- Lynx DeMuth – piano (track 2), harmony vocals (track 6)

=== Technical and others ===
- Tim Sonnenfeld – producer, engineering, mixing
- AC Sapphire – co-producer
- Mike Bardzik – mastering
- Johnny Hanson – producer, mixing, engineering (track 11) at The Nest Studios
- Harlan Steinberger – producer, mixing, mastering (tracks 7, 9) at Hen House Studios (Venice, CA)
- Lynx DeMuth – producer, engineer (track 2), mixing (track 6)
- Howard Billerman – producer, engineer (track 6)
- Carly Valentine – photography
- Adam Bulgasem – cover design
- Victoria Williams, Dennis Sadler, Cindy Sadler – special thanks
