= The HIRS Collective =

American queercore/grindcore group from Philadelphia

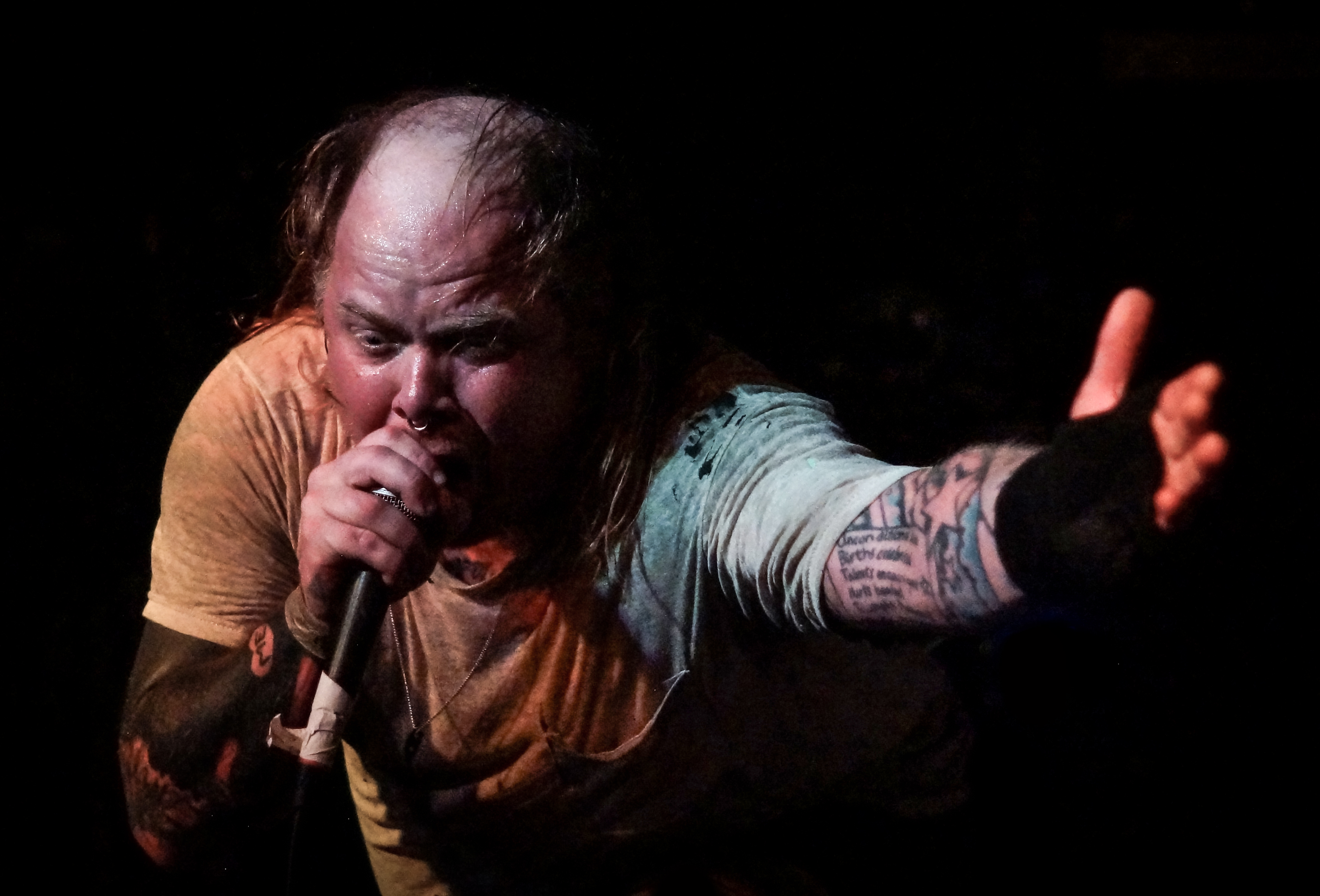
- Pup performing in The HIRS Collective, 2025.

Background information
- Also known as: +HIRS+ (early)
- Origin: Philadelphia, Pennsylvania
- Genres: Queercore; grindcore; powerviolence; hardcore; thrash
- Years active: 2011–present
- Labels: SRA; Get Better
- Spinoffs: Jenna and the Pups
- Members: Jenna Pup; Esem

The HIRS Collective, formerly known as simply +HIRS+ (pronounced "heers"), is an American queer punk musical collective based in Philadelphia. Founded in 2011 by vocalist Jenna Pup and guitarist Esem, they have amassed over 50 releases, including two studio albums for Get Better Records, Friends. Lovers. Favorites. (2018) and We're Still Here (2023). Both albums drew media attention for their extensive high-profile featured artists, including Garbage's Shirley Manson, Screaming Females' Marissa Paternoster, and My Chemical Romance's Frank Iero. The group has also been noted for their fluid lineup, short, abrasive songs, and radical queer/trans-minded politics. They have been branded "Queercore's resident supergroup" by Alternative Press.

== History ==
=== 2011–2018: Origins and early releases ===
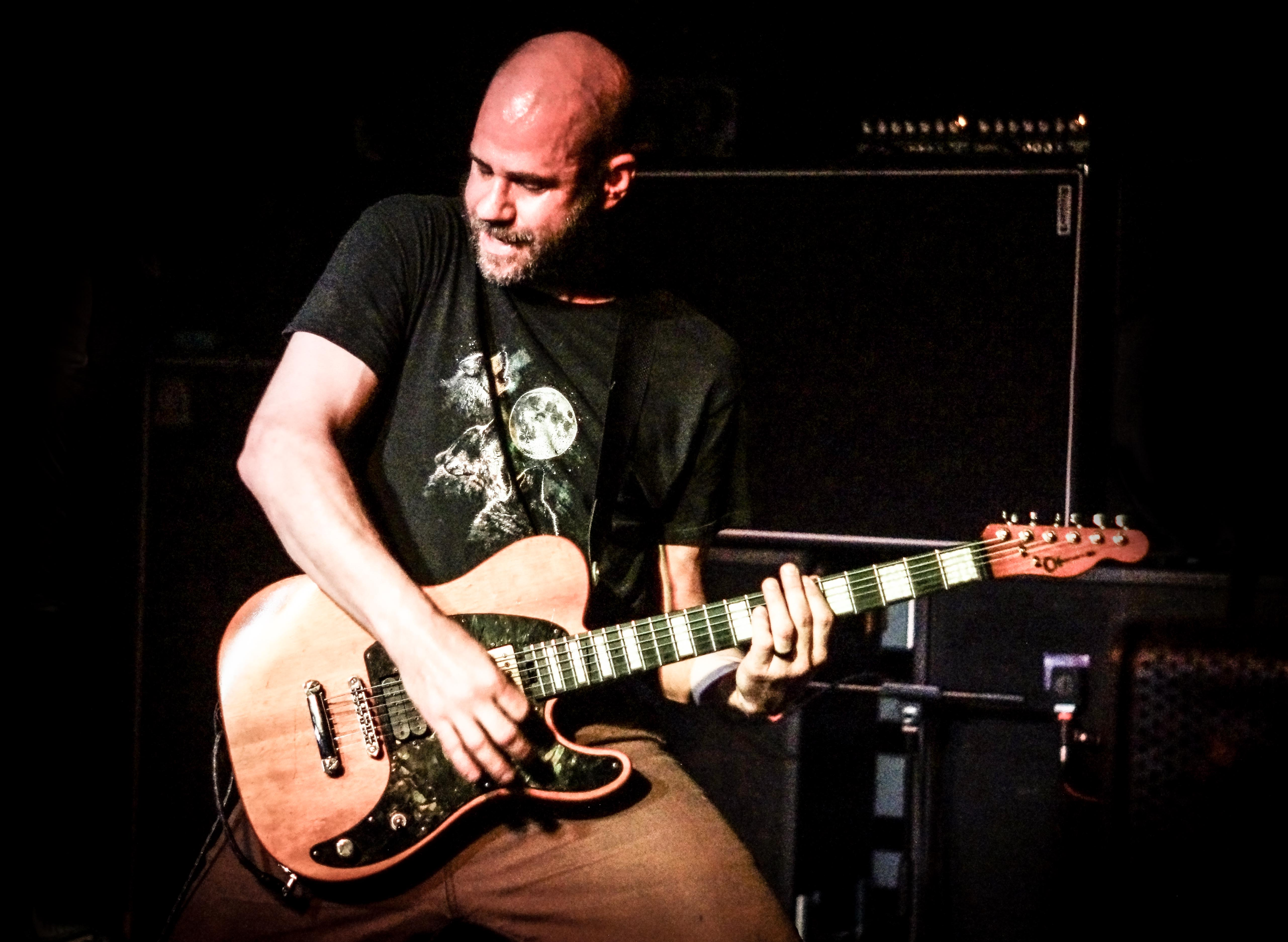
Esem performing in The HIRS Collective, 2025.

The HIRS Collective, originally known as +HIRS+, was formed in 2011 in Philadelphia, Pennsylvania by vocalist Jenna "JP" Pup and guitarist Scott "Esem". (The group's members are semi-anonymous and do not use last names.) Their name is derived from the eponymous third-person neopronoun, commonly used by non-binary people.

During the group's first few years, they issued a string of limited-release splits, 7" singles, EPs, cassette tapes, lathes, and a MiniDisc, as well as the 2012 compilation album The First 100 Songs. Earlier that year, HIRS appeared at Two Piece Fest with Trophy Wife and were a headlining act at Riot Fest, alongside Refused, The Promise Ring, August Burns Red, Off!, and BoySetsFire. They also joined the 2013 Philadelphia Ladyfest with acts including Screaming Females, U.S. Girls, Aye Nako, Priests, and Black Wine, and performed at the First Unitarian Church of Philadelphia in April 2014 with Perfect Pussy and Yamantaka // Sonic Titan. During the month of October, the group released a series of daily covers of acts including System of a Down and God Is My Co-Pilot. These were subsequently included on a split cassette with the band Slothspring, which Impose Magazine named one of the "Best Splits, Compilations & Collaborations of 2014".

The band came to the attention of SRA Records, which had also issued releases by Flag of Democracy and Trophy Wife and whose owner, BJ Howze, knew the members of HIRS from a previous band. SRA re-released The First 100 Songs in 2014, and released the group's follow-up compilation, The Second 100 Songs, on May 12, 2015. During this time, the group toured in Philadelphia, Australia, and the West Coast, developing a following in both extreme music circles and in the queer punk scene.

While recording a 2015 split with the group Peeple Watchin', the band brought in additional musicians due to Pup recovering from surgery, which led to the group taking a more collaborative approach going forward. Pup and Esem began characterizing HIRS as a collective rather than a traditional band, and by their 2017 EP How to Stop Street Harassment, the lineup had expanded beyond the original duo and they had renamed themselves The HIRS Collective.

In April 2017, the HIRS Collective performed at Get Better Records's 4th annual Get Better Fest alongside Soul Glo, Amanda X, Thin Lips, Pinkwash, and Radiator Hospital, which benefitted the Trans Assistance Project, Youth Emergency Services, and Women Against Abuse. They also appeared on the label's compilation album A Benefit Comp To Help Pay Medical Bills For Those Activists Fighting Against Fascism & Racism alongside Cayetana, Potty Mouth, Screaming Females, Sadie Dupuis, Worriers, Palehound, Mannequin Pussy, and Joe Jack Talcum. Produced in the wake of the Unite the Right rally in Charlottesville, Virginia, the album's proceeds benefitted two "Defend C-Ville" fundraising efforts as well as relief efforts for Hurricane Harvey in Houston.

=== 2018–2020: Friends. Lovers. Favorites. ===
In February 2018, the HIRS Collective announced the release of their first full-length album, entitled Friends. Lovers. Favorites.. Released April 20 via SRA and Get Better, the album was noted for its long list of high-profile guest artists, which included Garbage's Shirley Manson, Against Me!'s Laura Jane Grace, Screaming Females' Marissa Paternoster, Soul Glo's Pierce Jordan, RVIVR's Erica Freas, G.L.O.S.S.'s Sadie Switchblade, Limp Wrist's Martin Sorrondeguy, and The Bags' Alice Bag, a lineup that NPR wrote "truly ties together a long history of queer punk". Pup noted that, in contrast to prior releases that were written and recorded quickly, Friends. Lovers. Favorites. took around four years to assemble. The album was released with the group's out-of-print 2016 EP You Can't Kill Us, as well as a remix project titled You Can't Remix Us featuring mixes by Moor Mother, Kilbourne, and Lilium Kobayashi

The album's release coincided with HIRS supporting Screaming Females on tour alongside Thou, as well as a split album with the latter, I Have Become Your Pupil. In June, they recorded a five-song flexi disc EP, Coming Out of the Coffin, for a cover issue of New Noise Magazine, which featured Paternoster, RVIVR's Mattie Jo Canino, War On Women's Shawna Potter, Night Witch's Rosie Richeson, and Thou's Bryan Funck. The following month, they supported Paint It Black at a show in Asbury Park alongside Screaming Females and Bacchae. In 2019, they performed at Empath's album release show in West Philadelphia and with The Body and Stinking Lizaveta at Philadelphia's Kung Fu Necktie venue, and were ranked by Kerrang! as one of the "50 Best American Hardcore Bands Right Now".

=== 2020–present: The Third 100 Songs and We're Still Here ===
During the COVID-19 pandemic in 2020, the HIRS Collective released on August 26 Covid Covers Vol. 1, a four-song EP composed of covers of Garbage, Björk, and Enkephalin, which featured Paternoster and Dr. Mace. Later in the year, they posted to Instagram looking for vocalists to record unreleased demos.

In April 2021, the band announced a new 100 Songs compilation, The Third 100 Songs, alongside the single "Love,". A double album combining new material with songs from past recordings, the album was released on June 25 via Get Better and saw Paternoster, Moor Mother, Funck, Potter, and Canino return as collaborators. In November, they performed with Pissed Jeans in Bethlehem, Pennsylvania.

In October 2022, the HIRS Collective announced a second full-length album for Get Better, We're Still Here, with an eponymous lead single featuring Shirley Manson and AC Sapphire. A second single, "Sweet Like Candy", was released in December and featured Thou's Bryan Funck, Maha Shami of screamo band NØ MAN, and former Less Than Jake saxophonist Jessica Joy Mills. "Trust the Process", featuring Night Witch's Rosie Richeson and My Chemical Romance's Frank Iero, was released in January, and a music video for "XOXOXOXOXOX" featuring Melt-Banana premiered the following month. The album's other guest artists, totaling 35 over 17 tracks, included a returning Paternoster and Jordan as well as Geoff Rickly (Thursday), Jeremy Bolm (Touché Amoré), Damian Abraham (Fucked Up), Justin Pearson (The Locust), Nate Newton (Converge), Anthony Green (Circa Survive, Saosin), Dan Yemin (Paint It Black, Lifetime), Christina Michelle (Gouge Away), Jordan Deyer (La Dispute), Chris Barker (Anti-Flag), Chip King (The Body), Dylan Walker (Full of Hell), Derek Zanetti (The Homeless Gospel Choir), and Pinkwash. HIRS self-produced the album, recording at Esem's studio as well as Permanent Hearing Damage Studio in Philadelphia.

The album was released digitally on December 25, 2022 with a full physical release via Get Better on March 24, 2023. That same month, the group launched a Spring 2023 tour with a show in Washington, D.C. They were also announced to join Toronto's New Friends Fest in August 2023, alongside Pg. 99, Gulfer, Joie De Vivre, and Stay Inside.

== Other projects ==
Frontwoman Jenna Pup co-founded and co-owns Get Better Records. She has a pop punk solo project, Jenna and the Pups, which has released two albums as well as a 2018 split album with HIRS. In 2021, Pup was featured on a metal cover of Prince's "I Would Die 4 U" by the YouTube channel Two Minutes to Late Night alongside Lamb of God's Randy Blythe, Gorilla Biscuits's Walter Schreifels, Most Precious Blood's Rachel Rosen, and many others.

== Artistry and beliefs ==
=== Musical style ===
The HIRS Collective are most commonly identified as grindcore, as well as punk rock, hardcore punk, powerviolence, thrash, and metalcore. In the tradition of these genres, their songs are typically abrasive and short in length, with many ranging from less than 30 seconds to under a minute; frontwoman Jenna Pup has said "If something needs to be longer, we’ll make it longer, but it seems we’re able to get our points across quickly." Many songs make use of samples, from sources as varied as Stranger Things, Angelica Ross's Her Story monologue, The Powerpuff Girls, The Crying Game, and an emergency broadcast recorded during the George Floyd protests; Pup has said that the samples are used to complement her vocals and help explain the song to listeners. Vice described a typical HIRS song in 2015 as: "Sample from a movie. Heavy blastbeats. Fast and pounding guitar riffs. Screamed, mostly unintelligible vocals. Repeat."

Pup has disagreed with the group's classification as grindcore, saying, "I understand, there's blastbeats and people want to call it grind and all these other genres, but we've always just agreed that any band that we're ever in is a punk band." NPR's Lars Gotrich similarly wrote that "To simply call HIRS' extreme coalescence 'grindcore' does the band a bit of an injustice", noting that their album Friends. Lovers. Favorites. included "sludgy punk spitballs shot from Iron Lung and His Hero Is Gone, the euphoric digital-grind of Melt-Banana, Nasum's death-metal-grooved grind and hints of Converge's chaotic hardcore roots", as well as Blood Brothers-esque screeching on "Hard to Get". Tiny Mix Tapes described the album as "pop music", comparing its brighter production to that of early 2000s Relapse Records albums, and noted that the group had "moved from the frenetic-burst approach of their countless early EPs" and embraced pop music's "emphasis on movement and emotional response bound together in a joyful, sweaty room". Noel Gardner of The Quietus saw the album as having the vocals of Converge, the guitar and bass of Nails, and the drums of Napalm Death.

For We're Still Here, the group's signature heavy sound incorporated the wide-ranging styles of the album's guest artists, with songs drawing from heavy metal, stadium rock, crust punk, digital hardcore, noise rock, screamo, bubblegum, and cybergrind, while closing track "Bringing Light and Replenishments" features a choir, piano, and cello. Alternative Press described the band's song "Trust the Process" as having "panic chords that recall early Botch and Converge" and Frank Iero's vocals on the song as resembling those of Glassjaw, Antioch Arrow, and Pg.99. The album also paid tribute to the group members' love of hip hop; the music video for "Trust the Process" is an homage to that of the Beastie Boys' 1992 single "So What'cha Want", while the song "Judgement Night" samples Onyx and Biohazard's title track from the 1993 Judgement Night soundtrack and features 808 drops. Jenna Pup said that she had sought to make "a Hot Topic sampler-meets-hip-hop record where every single song has a feature", and noted at the time of the album's release that she was listening to music by Wu-Tang Clan, Logic, and Bo Burnham.

Punknews.org compared the group's sound and philosophy to that of G.L.O.S.S., although noting that HIRS had a louder, harsher sound and less of a traditional band structure. The group has also drawn sonic comparison to Pig Destroyer, Municipal Waste, and early Liturgy.

Pup and guitarist Esem typically split core songwriting duties, with guest collaborators adding their own touches after the fact. Esem said of this process: "It's almost like there's a framework — the body and the muscles — and then there's like the clothing. And then to make the whole outfit work, so-and-so might put like a cute little hat on." Pup noted that a song on We're Still Here marked the duo's first time collaborating with another songwriter. She also said that, while obtaining features for the album was a relatively simple process, "the mixing and the mastering and putting all the things where they needed to be and figuring out the sequence of the record and how it's going to flow – those were the difficult parts. We did either close to or over sixty hours of mixing – only mixing, not including recording."

=== Lyrics and ethos ===
The HIRS Collective are intensely politically outspoken, most prominently on the topic of transgender rights and other LGBTQ issues. (Jenna Pup is a trans woman while guitarist Esem identifies as queer.) They are aligned with queer anarchist, feminist, anti-police, and anti-authoritarian principles, and self-identify as "a collective of freaks and faggots that will never stop existing". Their lyrics have addressed topics including misogyny, religion and sexuality, transphobic violence, capitalism, racism and gentrification, mental health, suicidal ideation, overmedication, and the need for self-care. Their 2016 EP You Can't Kill Us was written while Pup was in a dark mental place and references her battles with suicidal ideation, while its follow-up, 2017's How To Stop Street Harassment, depicts trans women taking up arms in response to street harassment and rape culture. Such heavy subject matter is often counterbalanced by a ribald sense of humor (such as the song "MAGICal WANDerful", themed to Pup's Hitachi Magic Wand) and by positive sentiments of love, joy, survival, and finding strength in community.

The HIRS Collective embraces the label of "punk" as an ethos more than a genre, interpreting it as being "trying to be better people and burn the bridges of all the awful people and make sure to leave them behind." Pup has said that, while the group "started off with so much angst and aggression and anger", over time they chose to emphasize compassion for humanity a focus on the positive over the negative. The group's logo, a hand with sharp, hot pink fingernails brandishing a pocketknife, represents support for aggressive self-defense of the marginalized, with Pup explaining, "Violence is not the only answer, but we support it when necessary".

=== Live performances ===
The website Them described the group's live show as "primal scream therapy for transfeminine rage". Their live setup typically consists of Pup and Esem performing over backing tracks, and they are known to blast the music of Britney Spears in between songs. In keeping with their political ethos, the group strives for inclusivity in their live performances, including playing at all-ages shows, performing with marginalized artists, taking a sliding scale approach to ticket prices and merch sales, and inviting marginalized concertgoers to move to the front of the crowd at shows, as well as donating concert profits to local causes. They also make a point of performing in places unwelcoming to trans people.

== Members ==
The HIRS Collective has no solidified members. According to WXPN, by the time of Friends. Lovers. Favorites. (2018), the group had "[expanded] past the two piece guitar, vocals, drum machine, and giant wall of amps lineup that defined their sound and image" at their inception and had become "purposely nebulous in size".

The two known core members of the group are:

- Jenna Pup (aka JP) – vocals, drum machine
- Scott "Esem" – guitar, bass, drum machine

Additionally, Get Better Records head Alex Lichtenauer is an occasional live drummer for the group.

== Discography ==
=== Studio albums ===
Title	Album details
Friends. Lovers. Favorites.	Released: April 20, 2018; Label: SRA/Get Better; Format: CD, Digital
We're Still Here	Released: March 24, 2023; Label: Get Better; Format: CD, Digital

=== EPs ===
Year	Title	Label	Notes
2011	Worship	Self-released	
2012	Dimebag	Self-released	
2012	Vagaytion/Gaycation	Self-released	
2013	Remixxxes	Self-released	
2013	Shut Down the Machine	Maybe It's Art	
2013	Antichristmas * Happy Holigays	Bastard Tapes	
2014	Madonna	Behind The Mountain	
2015	The Sexxxy Flexxxi	Get Better	
2016	Build Your Own Bro Smasher	Get Better	
2016	You Can't Kill Us	Get Better	
2017	How To Stop Street Harassment	Get Better	
2018	Coming Out of the Coffin	Get Better	Produced as a flexi disc for an issue of New Noise Magazine
2020	Friends. Lovers. Favorites. MMXVI Demos	Self-released	
2020	Covid Covers Vol. 1	Self-released	
2021	CovidSixNine Live 2020	Self-released	

=== Compilations ===
Year	Title	Label
2012	The First 100 Songs	SRA
2015	The Second 100 Songs	SRA
2021	The Third 100 Songs	Get Better

=== Singles ===
Year	Song	Album	Label
2014	"23:15 3.19.14"	non-album single	Bastard Tapes
2016	"Say Her Name"	The Third 100 Songs	Get Better
2017	"MAGICal/WANDerful"	The Third 100 Songs	Get Better
2021	"Love,"	The Third 100 Songs	Get Better
2021	"Affection & Care."	The Third 100 Songs	Get Better
2021	"Staying Alive" (ft. Stephen Inman)	The Third 100 Songs	Get Better
2022	"We're Still Here" (ft.Shirley Manson, AC Sapphire)	We're Still Here	Get Better
2022	"Sweet Like Candy" (ft. Nø Man, Thou, Jessica Joy Mills)	We're Still Here	Get Better
2023	"Trust The Process" (ft. Frank Iero, Rosie Richeson)	We're Still Here	Get Better
2023	"XOXOXOXOXOX" (ft. Melt-Banana)	We're Still Here	Get Better

=== Music videos ===
Year	Song	Director
2018	"Pedazos"	Riley Luce
2018	"Outnumbered"	The HIRS Collective
2018	"Demagogues"	Dawn Riddle
2018	"Assigned Cop at Birth"	The HIRS Collective
2018	"It's Ok to Be Sick"	Rosemary Engstrom
2021	"Love,"	The HIRS Collective
2021	"Staying Alive"	Stephen Inman
2022	"We're Still Here"	The HIRS Collective
2022	"Sweet Like Candy"	The HIRS Collective
2023	"Trust The Process"	The HIRS Collective
2023	"XOXOXOXOXOX"	The HIRS Collective

=== Cassette tapes ===
Year	Title	Label	Ref
2012	Nunmilk	Human Beard	
2013	Gaytheism	One Brick Today	
2017	Trans Girl Takeover 2017 Tour Tape	Self-released	

=== Split recordings ===
Year	Title	Split with	Label
2011	+HIRS+ / Towers	Towers	self-released
2011	Involuntary Splits	The Immaculates	self-released
2011	Maradona / +HIRS+	Maradona	Bastard Tapes
2012	Live From Motel Hell	Drums Like Machine Guns	Bastard Tapes
2012	Dlmg/+HIRS+	Drums Like Machine Guns	Bastard Tapes
2012	Shit Weather / Hirs	Shit Weather	Bastard Tapes
2012	+HIRS+ // Tooth Decay	Tooth Decay	Bastard Tapes
2012	Hulk Smash / +HIRS+	Hulk Smash	Bastard Tapes
2012	+HIRS+ / Nimbus Terrifix	Nimbus Terrifix	Bastard Tapes
2013	Destroy the Scene	Bros Fall Back	Bastard Tapes
2013	+HIRS+/Bubonic Bear	Bubonic Bear	Bastard Tapes
2013	Hirvana / Very Ape	APE!	Bastard Tapes
2014	Water Torture / +HIRS+	Water Torture	Nice Dream
2014	Cocaine Breath / +HIRS+ Split 2"	Cocaine Breath	Bastard Tapes
2014	The HIRS Collective/Peeple Watchin' Split	Peeple Watchin'	Bastard Tapes
2014	Needle Breaker	Deceiver	Bastard Tapes
2014	Shit Split	Heavy Medical	Bastard Tapes
2014	+HIRS+/Heavy Medical Split	Heavy Medical	Bastard Tapes
2014	Sloth Esteem	The Slothspring	Self-released
2016	Split	Lives	Get Better
2017	Hiromanticstates	Romantic States	Get Better
2017	Happy Holidays from the Hirs Collective and Toxic Womb	Toxic Womb	Get Better
2018	Split w/ Godstomper	Godstomper	Get Better
2018	I Have Become Your Pupil	Thou	Get Better
2018	Jenna and the Pups/The HIRS Collective Split	Jenna and the Pups	Get Better
2018	Love Ya Like A Sister	Night Witch	Get Better
2020	There's Good in All of Us	Thou	Get Better
2022	Cowboy Wisdom	Jenna and the Pups, Hank V	Sisters in Christ
