= Halfway Festival =

Music festival in Białystok, Poland

- Genre: Singer-songwriter, folk, alternative, indie, rock, electronic
- Dates: Last weekend of June (3 days)
- Locations: Białystok, Poland
- Years active: 2012–2019
- Founders: Podlaskie Opera and Philharmonic – European Art Centre
- Website: www.halfwayfestival.com

Halfway Festival is a music festival which took place in Northeastern Poland, in Białystok in the last week of June from 2012 to 2019. The festival's main organizer was the Podlaskie Opera and Philharmonic – European Art Centre.

== Idea ==
Halfway Festival is a gathering involving songwriters, folk, and alternative musicians.

== Place ==
Halfway Festival takes place in an amphitheatre at the Podlaskie Opera and Philharmonic – European Art Centre in Białystok. The stage is located close to the audience.

In between concerts it is possible to spend time in a green milieu around the amphitheatre. There is a DJ area to dance or listen to good electronic music. There are stalls with many kinds of tea, regional beer, grilled food, festival gadgets.

== Artists ==
=== 2019 ===
==== Friday 28 June ====
- Wędrowiec
- Gyða
- These New Puritans

Saturday 29 June

- Kotori
- Oxford Drama
- KÁRYYN
- My Brightest Diamond
- Julia Holter

Sunday 30 June

- Palina
- Tęskno
- Alice Phoebe Lou
- Foxing
- Strand of Oaks

=== 2018 ===
==== Friday 29 June ====
- Seasonal
- amiina
- Low

==== Saturday 30 June ====
- ugla
- Annie Hart
- Pia Fraus
- Jane Weaver
- Villagers

==== Sunday 01 July ====
- Francis Tuan
- TonqiXod
- Anna Ternheim
- Orchestre Tout Puissant Marcel Duchamp XXL
- The Besnard Lakes

=== 2017 ===
==== Friday 23 June ====
- Starsabout (Poland)
- Christine Owman (Sweden)
- Shuma (Belarus)

==== Saturday 24 June ====
- Agata Karczewska (Poland)
- Cate Le Bon (United Kingdom)
- Juana Molina (Argentina)
- TORRES (United States)
- The Veils (United Kingdom)

==== Sunday 25 June ====
- Coals (Poland)
- East of My Youth (Iceland)
- Nive & The Deer Children (Greenland)
- Cass McCombs Band (US)
- Angel Olsen (US)

=== 2016 ===
==== Friday 24 June ====
- Byen (Poland)
- Ilya (United Kingdom)
- Destroyer (Canada)

==== Saturday 25 June ====
- Coldair (Poland)
- Odd Hugo (Estonia)
- Eivør Pálsdóttir (Faroe Islands)
- Accolective (Israel)
- Ane Brun (Norway)

==== Sunday 26 June ====
- Intelligency (Belarus)
- Giant Sand (USA)
- Mammút (Iceland)
- Julia Marcell (Poland)
- Wilco (USA)

=== 2015 ===
==== Friday 26 June ====
- Nathalie and The Loners (Poland)
- .K (Belarus)
- Moddi (Norway)
- Gabriel Ríos (Belgium)

==== Saturday 27 June ====
- JÓGA (Poland)
- Garbanotas Bosistas (Lithuania)
- She Keeps Bees (USA)
- Vök (Iceland)
- William Fitzsimmons (musician) (USA)

==== Sunday 28 June ====
- Maggie Björklund (Denmark)
- Sister Wood (Poland/England)
- Oly. (Poland)
- Sharon van Etten (USA)
- The Antlers (band) (USA)

=== 2014 ===
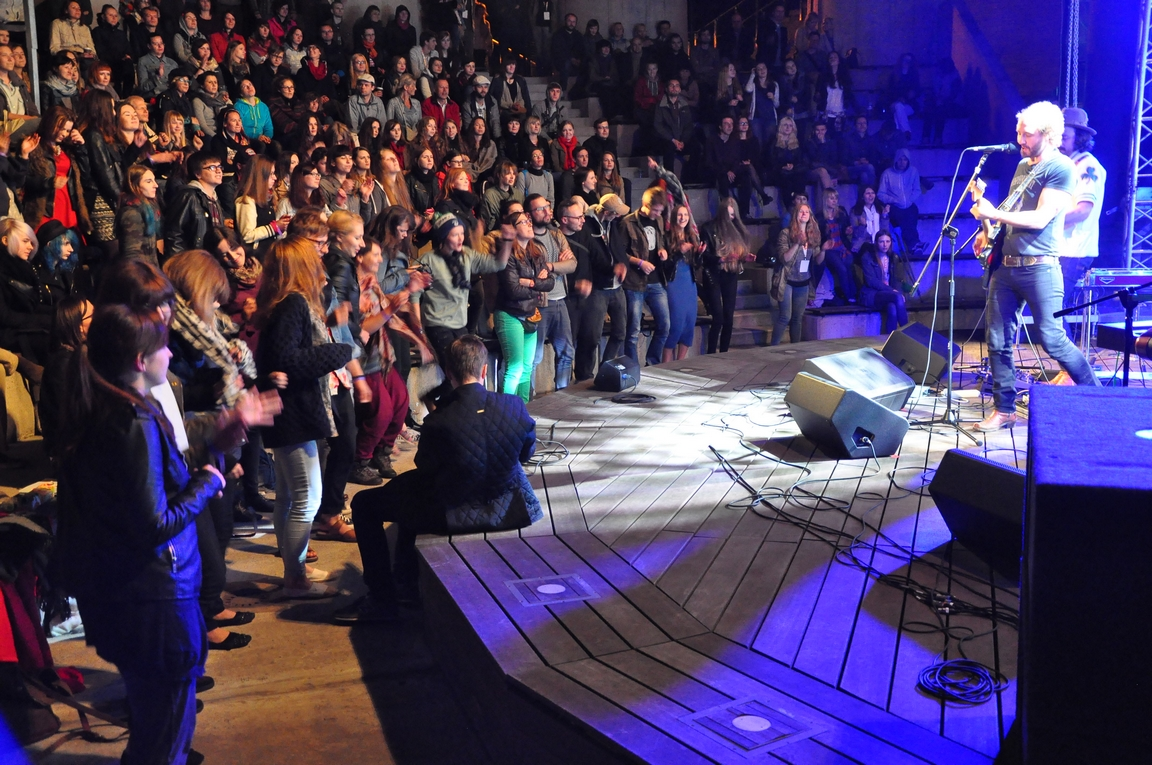
Phosphorescent at Halfway Festival 2014 in Białystok

==== Friday 27 June ====
- Overdriven Group (Poland)
- Keegan McInroe (USA)
- Phosphorescent (band) (USA)

==== Saturday 28 June ====
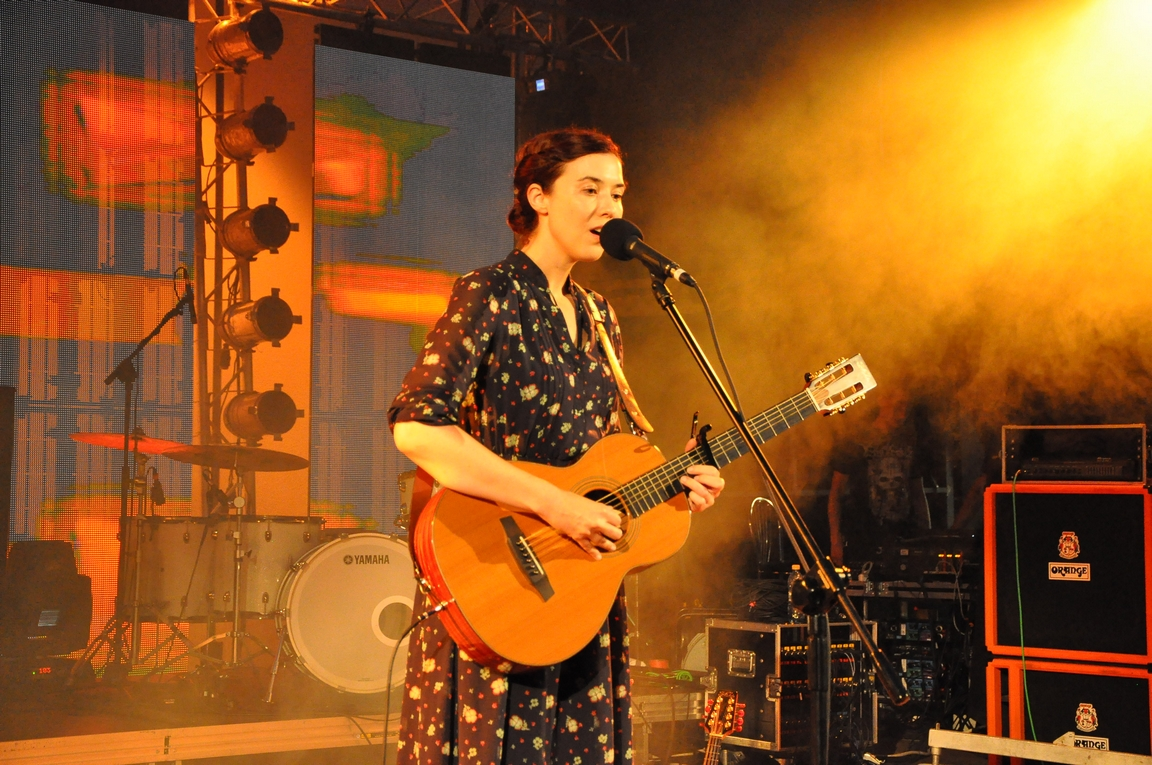
Lisa Hannigan at Halfway Festival 2014

- Sonia Pisze Piosenki (Poland)
- Lord & The Liar (Poland)
- Fismoll (Poland)
- Pascal Pinon (Island)
- Theodore (Greece)
- My Brightest Diamond (USA)

==== Sunday 29 June ====
- Navi (Belarus)
- Daniel Spaleniak (Poland)
- Hymnalaya (Island)
- Lisa Hannigan (Ireland)
- Ewert and The Two Dragons (Estonia)

=== 2013 ===
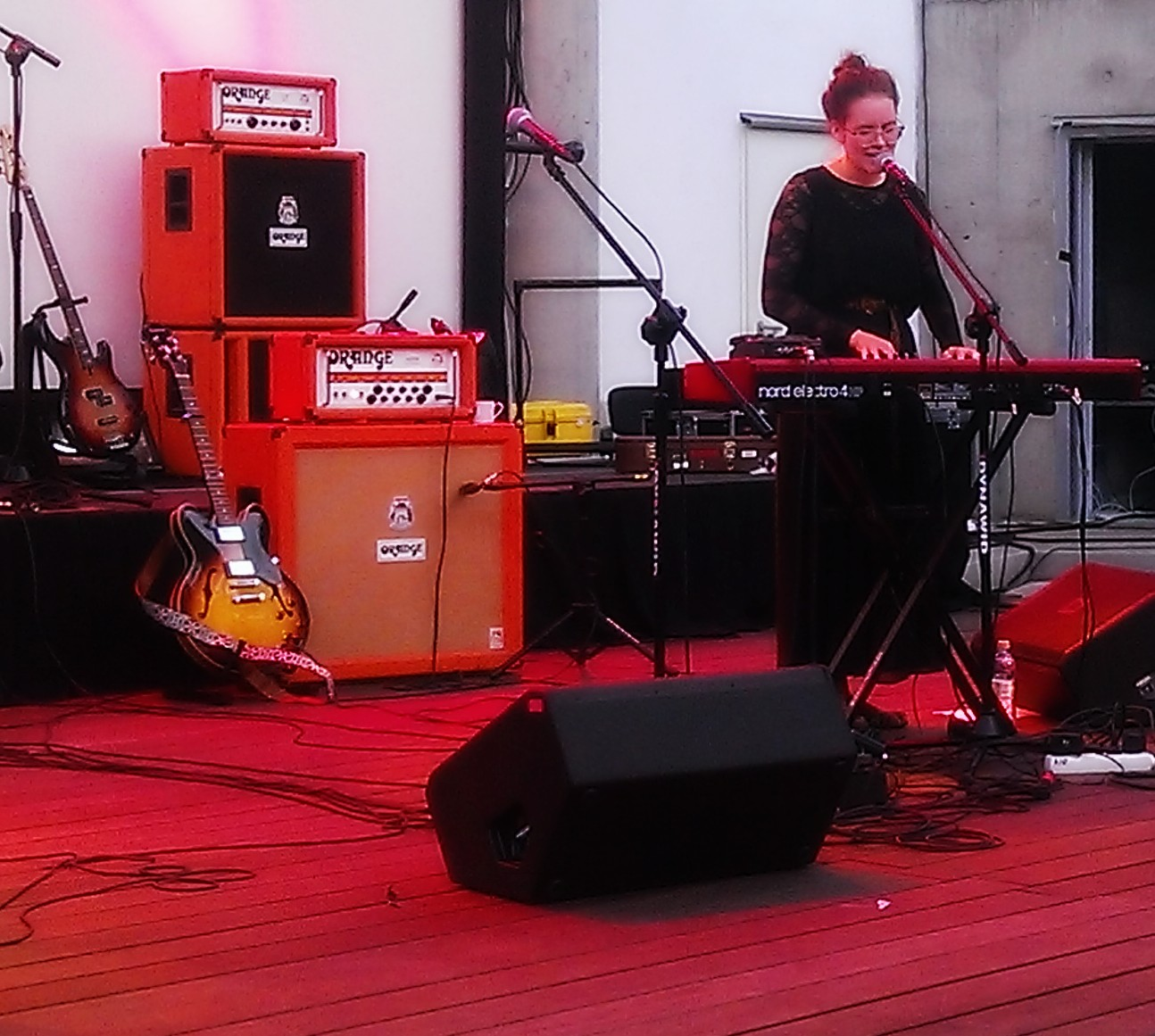
Sóley at Halfway Festival 2013

==== 28 June ====
- Wilhelm Jerusalem (Poland)
- Anna von Hausswolff (Sweden)
- Under Byen (Denmark)

==== 29 June ====
- Bobby the Unicorn (Poland)
- HandmadE (Belarus)
- Sóley (Island)
- SoKo (France)
- Sivert Høyem (Norway)

==== 30 June ====
- Markas Palubenka (Lithuania)
- Gin Ga (Austria)
- Domowe Melodie (Poland)
- Local Natives (USA)
- Emilíana Torrini (Island)

=== 2012 ===
- Lifemotiv (Poland)
- Palina Respublika (Belarus)
- Alina Orlova (Lithuania)
- Sébastien Schuller (France)
- Ludzi Na Bałocie (Belarus)
- Lech Janerka (Poland)
- Low Roar (Island)
- The Mountain Goats (USA)
- Kapela ze Wsi Warszawa (Poland)
- FolkRoll (Belarus)
- Re1ikt (Belarus)
- The Loom (USA)
- Vasya Oblomov (Russia)
- Chłopcy kontra Basia (Poland)
- Haydamaky (Ukraine)
- Sin Fang (Island)
- Great Lake Swimmers (USA)
- Woven Hand (USA)

== Tickets and schedule ==
There are two kinds of tickets available: three-day passes for the whole festival and one-day passes.

There are places in Białystok where the participants can find rooms for lower prices, as well as discounts at artistic cafés, restaurants, and pubs that cooperate with Halfway and its organizers.

All concerts start early in the evening. Prior to them, it is possible to enjoy the attractions prepared by the organizers, e.g. meet & greet with the bands, writers, yoga trainings and many others – depending on the edition of the festival.

== Artists about the festival ==
- Lisa Hannigan: "Lovely venue and audience! It was just really lovely... (…) I’m hoping I will be invited back."
- Shara Worden (My Brightest Diamond) – asked why she came to Europe without a European tour, only for the festival – answered: "I was invited. (laugh) I’s that simple. I heard how lovely this festival was so I thought it was a great opportunity to finally come to Poland. So I did."
- Matthew Houck (Phosphorescent (band)): "It's gorgeus here! It's way more gorgeous than I thought it could be!"
- Theodore: „One of the best gigs in my life!"
