= Punk Rock Payroll =

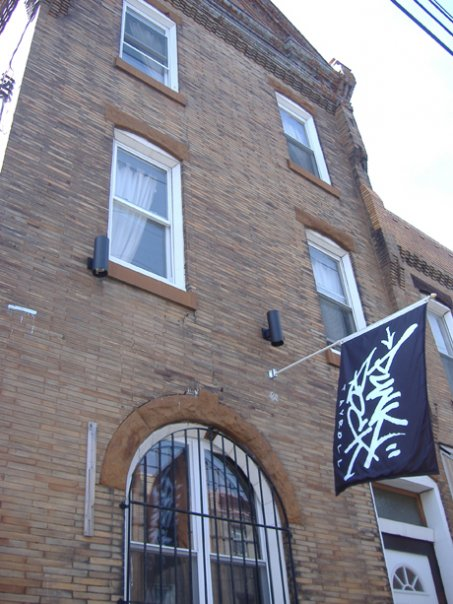
- Founded: 2003
- Founder: Frede Zimmer
- Status: Active
- Genre: Independent/Various
- Country of origin: United States
- Location: Philadelphia (South Philly), Pennsylvania
- Official website: http://www.punkrockpayroll.com

Punk Rock Payroll is an American independent record label based in South Philadelphia, Pennsylvania. The label was founded in 2003 by Frede Zimmer as a merchandise company, and houses Philadelphia artists The Extraordinaires, Lux Perpetua, Dangerous Ponies, The Armchairs, and Kill You in the Face.

== History ==
Punk Rock Payroll began in 2003 as the brainchild of current CEO Frede Zimmer. Originally, the company was run out of a 2-bedroom apartment belonging to Zimmer and his wife Misty. Zimmer started his business making buttons, screenprinting album covers, and producing merchandise for local bands and other labels.

In 2004, Zimmer discovered Jay Purdy and Matt Gibson of The Extraordinaires, and is quoted as saying that it was "the natural progression of things" to expand the company into its own label. He then signed The Extraordinaires as Punk Rock Payroll's first act, and in 2006, they released the operatic full-length Ribbons of War.

== Trademark ==
CDs released on the label often abandon the traditional jewel case manner of packaging. Three albums from artists The Extraordinaires have been released as hand-bound, hand-screened storybooks with illustrations accompanying the album's lyrics. In 2008, split-7" record Battle of the Vans was released as a board game which included a hand-screened game board, dice, and game pieces. In 2009, artist Kill You in the Face released their EP, The Mighty Atlas, on a USB-enabled toy Ray Gun.

The company is often described as a DIY label, signing local artists and collaborating with them to produce much of the merchandise by hand.

== Artists ==
- The Extraordinaires
- Kill You in the Face
- Lux Perpetua
- Dangerous Ponies
- The Armchairs
