= The Armchairs =

American psychedelic rock band

- Origin: Philadelphia, United States
- Genre: Psychedelic rock
- Years active: 2007–May 13th, 2011
- Label: Punk Rock Payroll
- Members: Michael Chadwick; Michael Harkness; Andy Molholt; Andrew Morris
- Website: www.thearmchairs.com

The Armchairs was a psychedelic rock band based in Philadelphia consisting of Michael Chadwick on keys, guitar and vocals, Michael Harkness on drums, Andy Molholt on guitar, keys and vocals, and Andrew Morris on bass.

The band formed in 2007 when primary songwriters Molholt and Chadwick, then roommates at Columbia College, relocated to Philadelphia. In November 2008, Harkness and Morris, then roommates at the University of the Arts, completed the line-up and the group started to perform steadily in the area.

During the next three years, the band gradually became a notable band in Philadelphia music scene with a cult following throughout the region and into the rest of the east coast and Midwestern United States. The band developed a reputation for their eccentric live show which "[walked] the tightrope between absurdist performance art and solid pop-rock". Their on-stage bits included readings of The Communist Manifesto, Easter egg hunts, costume changes, and forcing audience members to take the stage to perform a song as the band takes a break. Musically, the band has been compared to Ween, The Mothers of Invention, Pavement, and The Kinks.

In 2010, The Armchairs were signed to Punk Rock Payroll for the release of their full-length album Science & Advice. The album was released in limited run hand-sewn, hand-screened travel pillows that contained a CD in a cardboard sleeve.

On April 1, 2011, The Armchairs announced that they were disbanding, citing “differing goals, differing musical and creative directions, increasing interpersonal tension, and the law of increasing atrophy (the 2nd law of thermodynamics)”.
