= Amanda X =

Rock band

Amanda X is a post-punk power pop all-female trio from Philadelphia. Billboard magazine has called them "leaders in their scene" and has described their harmonies as thrash power-pop. They have also received press coverage from Rolling Stone magazine and The Guardian. The band is composed of Melissa Brain on drums, Kat Bean on bass and Cat Park on guitar. Their sound has been compared to Sleater Kinney.

== Recordings ==
In 2012, the band released the EP, Ruin of the Moment. In 2014, the band debuted their full-length album, Amnesia, described by Rolling Stone Magazine as an arsenal of high velocity drums and post-punk hooks. The album was recorded at Uniform Recording Studios in Philadelphia on the imprint, Siltbreeze. They later released New Year (2015) and Hundreds and Thousands (2015). Their album, Giant, was released in August 2017. Cat Park also released an album, All Bad with punk musicians Evan Bernard of The Superweaks, and Jarret Nathan of PEARS on Get Better Records.

== See also ==
- Women in punk rock
