= The Extraordinaires =

- Origin: Philadelphia, U.S.A.
- Genres: Indie rock
- Years active: 2004–present
- Labels: Punk Rock Payroll
- Website: Official website

The Extraordinaires are a five-piece American indie rock band hailing from Philadelphia, Pennsylvania. Originally formed by Jay Purdy and Matt Gibson in 2004, is known for its use of storytelling within songs.

Their latest album, Electric and Benevolent (released in June 2009), is self described as “...almost a biography of a turn-of-the-century inventor genius...”.

== Members ==
Jay Purdy - Guitar, Vocals, Accordion, Piano

Adam Ravitz - Bass

Evan Smoker - Drums

Zach Poyatt - Guitar, Vocals

Koofreh Umoren - Trumpet, Woodblock

Mike Harkness - Sousaphone & Assorted Crockery

== Discography ==
=== Albums ===
- Dress for Nasty Weather (July 2014)
- The Pen Pals EP (October 2013)
- The Postcard EP (February 2011)
- Electric and Benevolent (June 2009)
- Battle of the Vans (w/ Kill You in the Face) (March 2008)
- Short Stories (June 2006)
- Ribbons of War (2005)
- Live on Brown College (2005)
