= Mike Valerio =

American film director

Mike Valerio is a writer, producer, director, and executive in the entertainment industry for over 20 years. Valerio has worked on over a hundred TV shows, films, documentaries, and mini-series and over a dozen television networks and entertainment companies. Valerio is most famous for his 1999 film Carlo's Wake.

== Filmography (partial) ==
- Alison Mathews: Art Matters – (2008) (Short Documentary) (Writer-director-Producer)
- Quantum Hoops – (2007) (Documentary film) (Creative consultant)
- My Network TV Premiere Special – (2006) (TV movie) (Writer-Consulting producer)
- NBC Premiere Week Preview – (2005) (TV) (Writer-director)
- Carlo's Wake – (1999) (Feature film) (Screenwriter-director)
- Stealth Force – (1993) (Unproduced film) (Screenwriter)
- King B: A Life in the Movies – (1993) (Documentary film) (Writer-director-Producer)

== Carlo's Wake (1999) (feature film) ==
Carlo's Wake, is an independent black comedy starring Academy Award winners Martin Landau and Rita Moreno. The film also stars actress/ writer Rosie Taravella who wrote the play "Pa's Funeral" on which Carlo's Wake is based. Taravella and Valerio co-wrote the screenplay together and were later married in 1994.

Carlo's Wake, Valerio's first feature film and was received with critical success. Valerio and Taravella divorced in 2004.

== Education and background ==
Valerio graduated from Rhode Island College in 1980 and began his career as producer of PM Magazine in Providence, Rhode Island at WJAR-TV. Valerio has since worked as a writer/ director/ producer & creative executive at companies including NBC, CBS, ABC, Warner Bros., Fox, Disney, Telepictures, and ABC Family.

== Entertainment executive ==
Valerio has held many executive positions at various production and entertainment companies.

- Director of Special Projects and [Comedy] Programs, NBC
- Executive director of Creative Services, Telepictures Prods.
- Vice President of Special Projects, Fox Broadcasting
- Director of Filmmaking#Development, Jay Silverman Productions
