= Christopher Paul Stelling =

American folk singer and guitarist

- Also known as: CPS, C.P. Stelling
- Born: Christopher Paul Stelling; February 19, 1982 (age 44)
- Origin: Daytona Beach, Florida, United States
- Genres: Singer-songwriter, folk
- Occupations: Musician, songwriter
- Instruments: Vocals, guitar
- Labels: ANTI-, Mecca Lecca Recording Co.
- Website: http://www.christopherpaulstelling.com

Christopher Paul Stelling (born February 19, 1982) is a singer-songwriter and guitarist currently based in Asheville, North Carolina. Stelling was born in Daytona Beach, Florida, and has also resided in Colorado, Washington, Massachusetts, and North Carolina. He has released five official albums: Songs of Praise and Scorn (2012), False Cities (2013), Labor Against Waste (2015), Itinerant Arias (2017) and Best of Luck (2020). He has extensively toured the United States and Europe. including performances at the Newport Folk Festival (2015, 2017). Christopher Paul Stelling has been featured on the NPR Music series Tiny Desk Concert and All Songs Considered.

== Songs of Praise and Scorn (2011–2012) ==
Stelling's official debut album was self released on February 21, 2012. Songs of Praise and Scorn was recorded with friends over a 5-day period in August 2011 in a 200-year-old, actively working funeral home in Kentucky. Fifteen songs were recorded, but only 10 made the cut for the actual album. The album was met with very favorable reviews, prompting The Village Voice to say, "Every song on his debut album Songs of Praise and Scorn cooks with both down-home comfort and avant-garde brio, Stelling building earthy folk troubadour stories over a fluster of wild arpeggios." American Songwriter noted, "Stelling is an artist who can leave one shaking one's head in bewilderment over how somebody can play difficult guitar parts and sing a completely disparate melody line at the same time. But he also hasn't forgotten how to just play simple chords when that's what a song calls for."

== False Cities (2013) ==
Stelling's second album, False Cities, was released on May 21, 2013 immediately following his first European tour. Rick Moore of Music News Nashville said of the album, "...he [Stelling] is among the best of the current crop of troubadours who are eking out a living by playing house concerts and driving to shows in cars held together with paper clips. His fingerpicking ability is a great asset, but he writes and sings with a drive and determination that a lot of his peers lack...Stelling is on top of his game when it comes to writing songs that will translate to the stage as he travels the country to deliver them." For UK/US music Web site There Goes the Fear, Carrie Clancy wrote, "Despite the obvious comparisons to more mainstream folk artists, the musical range of 'False Cities', especially Stelling's powerful vocal delivery, makes a unique impression. His fire-and-brimstone lyrics are by turns concretely narrative and vaguely evocative, depending on the tone and focus of the song. As a songwriter, Stelling handles his subject matter quite deftly." Chris Martins of SPIN magazine said of the album, "The finger-picking force sings his own quavering brand of hellfire ("The Waiting Swamp") and hope ("You Can Make It") across these 10 songs, which whip the listener back and forth like a steam-powered hayride."

== Labor Against Waste (2015) ==
The full length Anti- debut from the traveling singer-songwriter and finger-picker was heralded in the press, No Depression writing of Stelling,"The energy that this man is able to unleash through his songs and performances is unprecedented. The power and talent he beholds is a rare and beautiful thing” and Rolling Stone proclaiming, ”The record delights at the threshold of polished folk-pop and rustic old folk; and he seems bound to make converts on both sides of that divide.”

== Itinerant Arias (2017) ==
After three albums of intimate acoustic tracks, Itinerant Arias found Christopher Paul Stelling accompanied by a full band for a first time. This sonic shift away from traditional folk accentuated Stelling’s poignant lyrics, and provided increased depth to his impassioned vocals. In a glowing review, PopMatters wrote of Itinerant Arias, “over the course of four albums, Stelling has continued to refine that sound to his growing vision of our complex world. With Itinerant Arias he takes a bold and successful step forward as a bandleader and master chronicler of our times.” Of the album title, Stelling explained he settled on Itinerant Arias because “these songs have in common no single origin, or sense of place. like found objects, overheard stories, lost melodies... with no real home, but from a single voice.” Itinerant Arias was released on May 5, 2017, on Anti- records. To mark the album’s release, Christopher Paul Stelling provided a track-by-track breakdown of Itinerant Arias for NPR’s All Songs Considered.

== Best of Luck (2020) ==
Christopher Paul Stelling’s fifth album, Best of Luck, was released on February 13, 2020, on Anti- records. In 2016 a musical relationship was forged between Stelling and Ben Harper when Harper invited him to open at a series of well-known venues, including the Beacon Theatre, the Ryman Auditorium, Massey Hall. “He took me to all these legendary rooms. Just to see that what I could do would translate in spaces like that was revelatory,” said Stelling. Harper says he instantly recognized a kindred spirit in Stelling’s virtuosic finger picking and soulful delivery, and soon signed on to produce Best of Luck. Ben Harper recruited an all-star rhythm section for the recording sessions, including drummer Jimmy Paxson (Stevie Nicks, Dixie Chicks) and bassist Mike Valerio (Randy Newman, LA Philharmonic) to lend a versatility and finesse to Stelling’s soulful guitar playing. “I really believe this record is the intersection where folk and soul meet,” said Harper. Best of Luck debuted at No. 48 on the Americana Album Chart. Following the release of Best of Luck, Stelling embarked on an extensive tour of North America and Europe.
