= Tin Bird Choir =

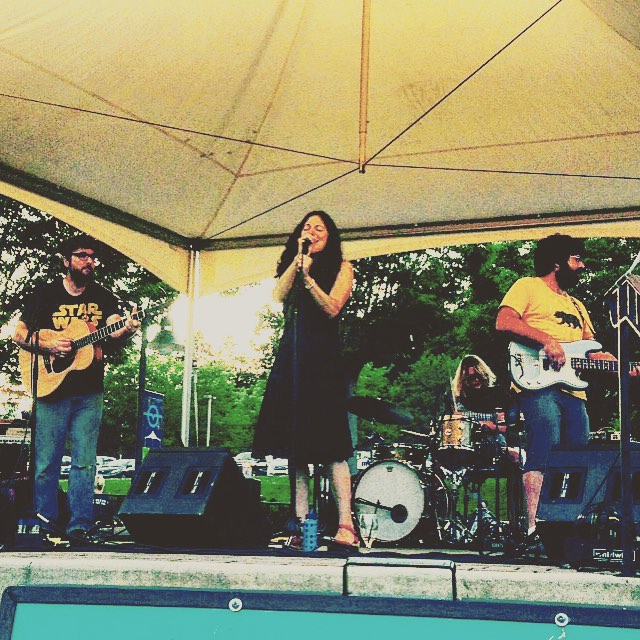
- Tin Bird Choir at Eagleview Concert Series

Background information
- Origin: Philadelphia, Pennsylvania, United States
- Genres: Rock, Americana
- Years active: 2007 - present
- Members: Eric Hurlock; Heather Hurlock; Josh Sceurman; Ellen Houle
- Website: www.tinbirdchoir.com

Tin Bird Choir is a barn rock band from Chester County, Pennsylvania. Eric and Heather Hurlock, Josh Sceurman, Ellen Houle, and Brad Hinton weave the poetry of rural life into urgent melodies and heartbreaking harmonies and pair it all with burning musicality. "Tin Bird Choir's mix of pop hooks, delicate harmonies, and tight playing is a winning blend," says, John Vettese of 88.5 WXPN. Their signature “barn rock” sound has earned them some national attention: Their recent single "Hide My Heart was picked up by SiriusXM The Village; Two songs off their sophomore album Homesteady, “Straight Face” and "Take Me With You When You Go," were picked up by Starbucks and are played in their stores worldwide. Another song off the Homesteady album, “Cheaper, Less Painful,” earned the band a spot as one of the regional finalists in the Mountain Stage Newsong Contest. Homesteady was one of the Top Albums of 2013.

Fully funded by fans through a Kickstarter campaign, Homesteady was recorded in Eric and Heather's barn in Coventryville, Pennsylvania, by Kevin Killen, and mastered by Glenn Barratt, of MorningStar Studios. Their soulful folk sound earned their first record, Barn Rock, a debut spot at #9 on the Roots Music chart.

Their songs have been played on AAA and folk radio stations across the country and have been featured prominently on Philadelphia radio station WXPN. They have appeared at the Philadelphia Folk Festival, the World Cafe Live, and the Kimmel Center in Philadelphia, The Bitter End in New York City, and coffee houses, clubs, and bars throughout the region.

== Biography ==
Tin Bird Choir is husband and wife Eric and Heather Hurlock along with musicians Josh Sceurman, Ellen Houle, and Brad Hinton.

In the Spring of 2007 Eric and Heather opened for a local band called The Youngers and after the show they were approached by members of the local musical community, Mike Yesconis, Josh Sceurman and Ellen Houle, who joined them in their barn for picking and playing. Soon TBC was practicing weekly and gigging regularly, playing at venues all around the Philly Metro area. In the Fall of 2009 they released their debut CD, Barn Rock.

In 2016, they started playing with Philly all-star Brad Hinton, who fills out their sound with 3-part harmonies and just the right amount of virtuosic guitar.

The band has received airplay on Philadelphia radio station 88.5 WXPN. Coverage in local media, including the Philadelphia City Paper, noted the group's appeal to audiences within the city's folk music scene. The Morning Call describe their debut album as featuring vocal harmonies and acoustic instrumentation.

== Discography ==
=== Albums ===
- Barn Rock (2009)
- Homesteady (2013)
