= Hoots & Hellmouth =

US musical group

- Hoots performing at World Cafe Live

Background information
- Origin: Philadelphia, Pennsylvania, United States
- Genres: Folk; Gospel; Rock; Americana
- Years active: 2005–present
- Label: MAD Dragon Records
- Members: Sean Hoots; Rob Berliner; Todd Erk; Mike Reilly; Andrew Gray
- Past members: Aaron Blouin; John Branigan; Tim Celfo; Ramon Sender; Matthew E. Stein; Krista Umile
- Website: Official website

Hoots & Hellmouth is an American gospel rock band from Philadelphia, Pennsylvania, United States.

== History ==
Hoots & Hellmouth was formed in 2005 by Sean Hoots and Andrew Gray. The formation of the band was partially a reaction to and a rebellion against the grandiose rock-star attitude of modern rock bands, with which they were previously involved. The group was initially started as a duo, playing roots music intended to evoke the revival feeling. They eventually expanded to four members after adding Pilot Round, Rob Berliner otherwise known as "The Sun guitarist"; and John Branigan. Most of the time, they play without a live drummer, instead stomping and using hand percussion such as tambourines. The group's self-titled debut appeared in 2007 on MAD Dragon Records, distributed by Warner. In early 2008, the album, Hoots & Hellmouth, won in The 7th Annual Independent Music Awards for Best College Record Label Album. Their follow-up album, The Holy Open Secret, was released in 2009. On Friday, August 21, as part of their months-long CD release tour, the band headlined their second WXPN Free at Noon concert, playing an 8-song set. The show, which was videotaped for WHYY-TV's weekly On Canvas program, took place at World Cafe Live and was broadcast live via radio. On April 19, 2010 "The Window in the Woodshed" was unveiled on HootsandHellmouth.com, the bands official website. A video for unreleased new material titled "The Photograph is Still." In early November 2010, the band unveiled through their Facebook page, Kickstarter, and other media that they were no longer carried by a label. They had been working on new material for some time and still wished to release a new album. Their Kickstarter project, titled "It came from the woodshed!" was announced on November 5, 2010, with an initial goal of $6,000 to produce and record a 6-song EP. Eventually, when the pledged total reached the $10,000 mark on November 23, the band issued an update asking for fans to reach the $15,000 mark so a full LP could be produced. By December 6, 2010, the campaign achieved $23,882 and was listed in Kickstarter's Hall of Fame, which lists 100 of the most successful Kickstarter campaigns since the company's inception in 2009. The album is presumably set to be recorded in February, 2011, while they are on tour in Ann Arbor, Michigan, which is where the band has studio time booked.

== Members ==
- Sean Hoots - guitar, vocals
- Andrew Gray - guitar, vocals
- Rob Berliner - mandolin, banjo, piano, organ, vocals
- Todd "Bud" Erk - upright and electric bass, vocals
- Mike Reilly - drums, vocals

== Discography ==
- YAW! Hallelujah for Hoots & Hellmouth (Self-Released Demo, 2005)
- Hoots & Hellmouth (Album, 2007)
- The Holy Open Secret (Album, 2009)
- Face First In The Dirt (EP, 2011)
- Salt (Album, 2012)
- In The Trees Where I Can See the Forest (Album, 2016)
- Uneasy Pieces (EP, 2017)
