= Chevrolet Astro =

American van by General Motors, 1985–2005

Chevrolet Astro/GMC Safari
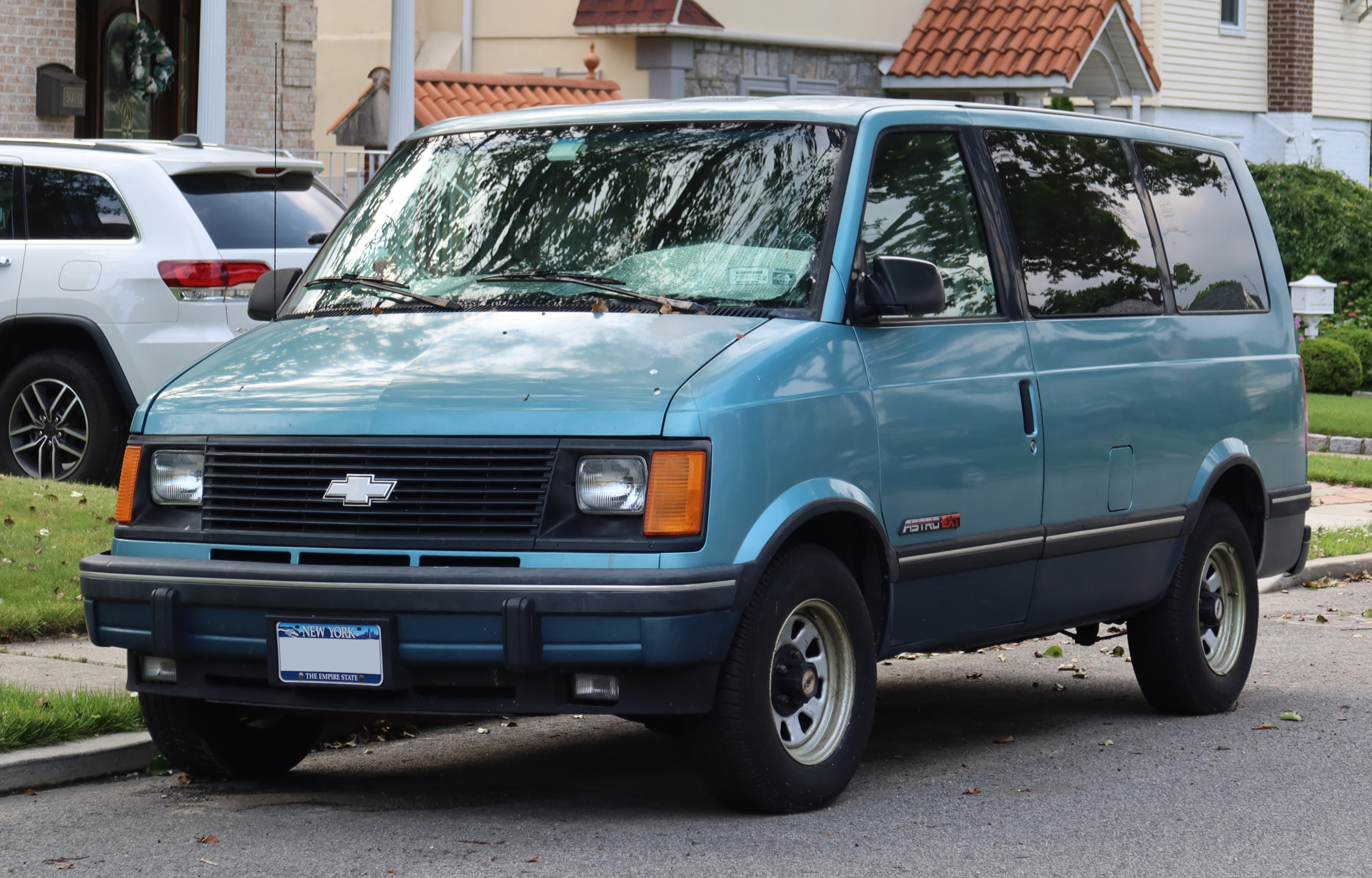
- 1994 Chevrolet Astro EXT

Overview
- Manufacturer: General Motors
- Also called: GMC Safari
- Production: 1985–2005
- Assembly: Baltimore Assembly, Baltimore, Maryland

Body and chassis
- Class: Minivan
- Body style: 3-door cargo van 3-door passenger van
- Layout: Front engine, Rear-wheel drive / All-wheel drive
- Platform: M-body (RWD) / L-body (AWD)

Powertrain
- Transmission: 4-speed automatic 4-speed manual 5-speed manual

Chronology
- Successor: Chevrolet City Express; Chevrolet Uplander

The Chevrolet Astro is a minivan that was manufactured and marketed by the Chevrolet division of American auto manufacturer General Motors from 1985 to 2005. Sold alongside the GMC Safari, the Astro was marketed in multiple configurations, including passenger van and cargo van.

The Astro and Safari used a rear-wheel-drive chassis; all-wheel drive became an option in 1990. For its entire production, the Astro and Safari were produced by Baltimore Assembly in Baltimore, Maryland; the vans would be the final model line produced by the facility. In total, approximately 3.2 million Astros and Safaris were produced from 1985 through 2005.

== Background ==
The Astro and Safari were introduced for the 1985 model year as the first minivan from General Motors. While marketed as a response to the first-generation Chrysler minivans, GM selected a rear-wheel drive layout, sizing the Astro and Safari closely to the short-wheelbase Chevrolet G10 van. Similar to the Ford Aerostar, to reduce production costs, GM adapted light-truck powertrain components; engines and transmissions were sourced from the Chevrolet S-10, allowing for a towing capacity of up to 5,500 lb (2,500 kg).

Prior to its use on a minivan, the Astro nameplate was used twice by General Motors; in 1967 (for the Chevrolet Astro 1 concept car) and from 1969 until 1987 (on the GMC Astro COE semitractor). GMC sourced the Safari nameplate from Pontiac (used by the latter to denote station wagons). As GMC was half of the Pontiac/GMC Division (later including Buick), from 1985 through 1989, both GMC and Pontiac Safaris were simultaneously offered through the same dealership network.

== First generation (1985–1994) ==
First generation
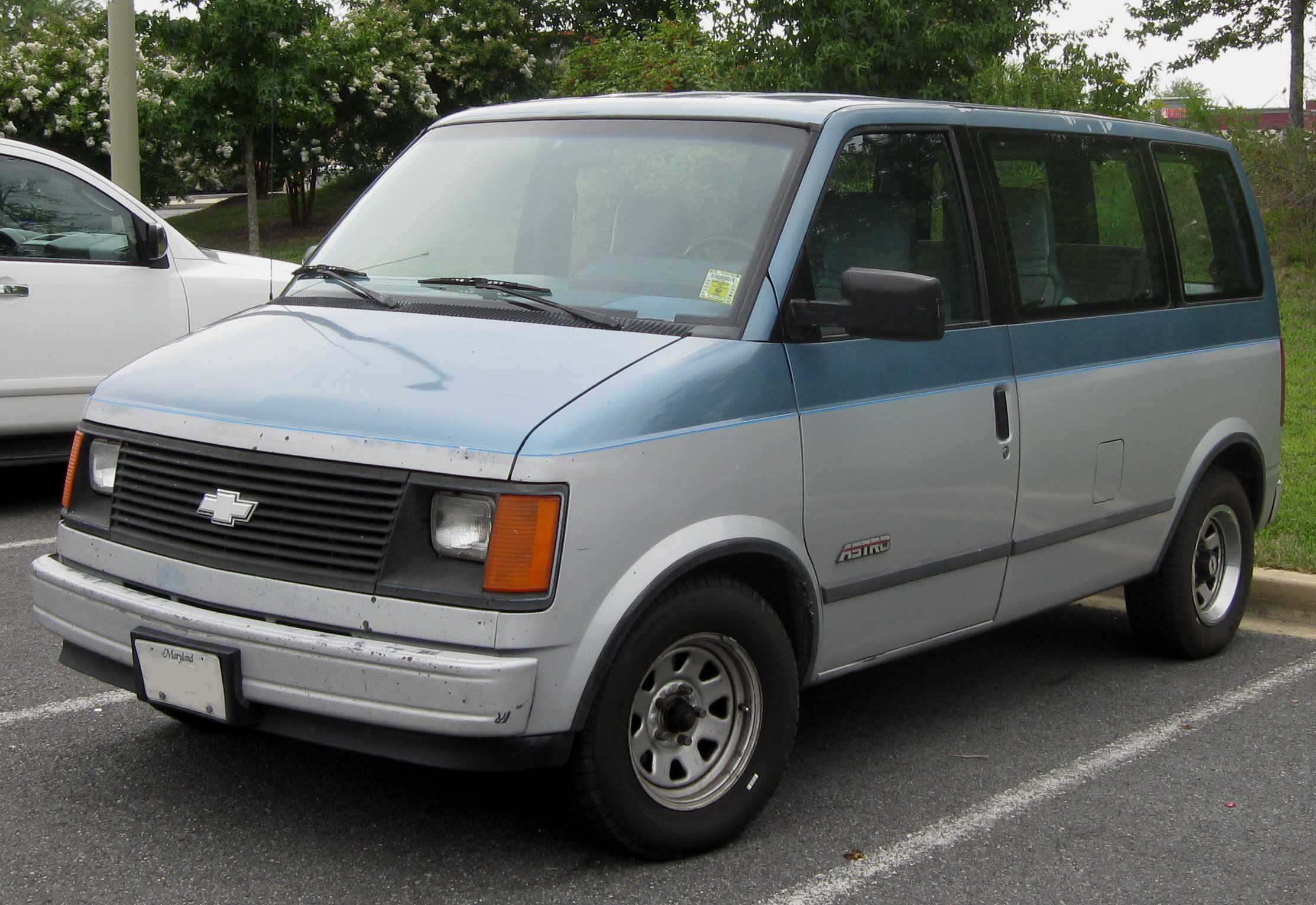
- 1985–1989 Chevrolet Astro

Overview
- Production: 1985–1994

Powertrain
- Engine: 2.5 L Tech IV 98 hp (73 kW) I4; 4.3 L 4300 165 hp (123 kW) V6; 4.3 L 4300 200 hp (150 kW) V6

Dimensions
- Wheelbase: 111.0 in (2,819 mm)
- Length: STD: 176.8 in (4,491 mm); EXT: 186.8 in (4,745 mm); 1992–95 Astro Cargo Van STD: 177.9 in (4,519 mm); 1992–95 Astro Cargo Van EXT: 187.9 in (4,773 mm)
- Width: 77.0 in (1,956 mm); 1992–95 Safari & Astro Cargo Van: 77.5 in (1,968 mm)
- Height: 1985–89: 73.7 in (1,872 mm); 1985–89 Cargo Van STD: 74.5 in (1,892 mm); 1990–91 STD: 74.9 in (1,902 mm); 1990–91 STD: 74.1 in (1,882 mm); 1992–95 Astro: 76.2 in (1,935 mm); 1992–94 Safari Cargo Van: 76.1 in (1,933 mm); 1992–95 Safari SLX: 76.4 in (1,941 mm); 1992–95 Safari 2WD EXT: 76.6 in (1,946 mm); 1992–95 Safari Cargo Van AWD STD: 75.7 in (1,923 mm); 1992–95 Safari Cargo Van AWD EXT: 76.0 in (1,930 mm)

Initial advertising boasted that it was a vehicle that will "make you realize that life is too big for a minivan," referring to the Chrysler minivans. The van can have a seating configuration between two and eight passengers.

Engine choices ranged from a 98 hp (73 kW; 99 PS) 2.5L four-cylinder to a 200 hp (149 kW; 203 PS) 4.3L V6, depending on options and model year. The 4-cylinder engine was only offered in short-length, rear-wheel-drive cargo vans, as well as passenger vans for 1985 only; it was dropped after 1990. For 1985, the 4.3L V6 (RPO LB1) used a 4-barrel carburetor. For 1986, throttle body fuel injection (TBI) was used. For 1992 and later years, a central port injection was used.

Much like the second-generation F-body 1970–1981 and X-body vehicles, the Astro/Safari (internally designated as the M-body for RWD models or L-body for AWD models) had a bolt-on subframe. For the M-van, the front suspension shared most components with the GM B-body station wagon (Chevrolet Caprice, Oldsmobile Custom Cruiser and larger variants of the Pontiac Safari and Buick Estate Wagon) with a leaf-spring rear suspension. The lower ball joints were larger than their B-body counterparts (similar to the 1977–96 Cadillac D platform vehicles; e.g., Fleetwood limousines). These ball joints were later used in the final Chevrolet Caprice 9C1 (police package) cars manufactured in 1995 and 1996. They also shared many mechanical similarities to the GMT 325/330 mid-size S/T pickups and utility vehicles.

Digital dashboards were offered in the first-generation Astro; this option did not continue after 1995.

1989 was the final year that the BorgWarner T-5 manual transmission was made available. All subsequent models were equipped with 700R4/4L60 automatic transmissions through 1993.

In 1990, a new all-wheel drive (AWD) system (the first U.S.-built minivan to do so), designed and developed by FF Developments (FFD), was made optional. The AWD models had a lower fuel economy: 17 miles per gallon on the highway versus 20 to 21 miles per gallon for rear-wheel-drive vans. AWD Astros used a BorgWarner 4472 transfer case.

The 1990 model year also introduced a new analog dashboard and the Hydroboost braking system, a system using the same accessory belt-driven pump to supply the power steering and brakes. In mid-1990, an extended body option, sharing its wheelbase with the shorter version, also became available.

In 1992, a new optional door form was introduced, colloquially known as Dutch doors. This form was two bi-parting doors with a flip-up window above. Previously, Astro and Safari vans were equipped only with bi-parting doors. An optional 4.3L V6 (RPO L35) engine with central port injection and a balance shaft was phased in.

In 1993, the electronically controlled 4L60E 4-speed automatic transmission with overdrive became standard as the sole transmission offering. As with many other 1993 model year GM vehicles, Scotchgard fabric protection also became a standard feature on Astro vans equipped with cloth seats. 1994 saw the addition of three new exterior paint colors. These colors were Indigo Blue Metallic (#39), Light Quasar Blue Metallic (#20), and Medium Quasar Blue Metallic (#80). The Astro and Safari also received center high mount stop lamps for 1994, which had been mandated on light trucks for the model year.

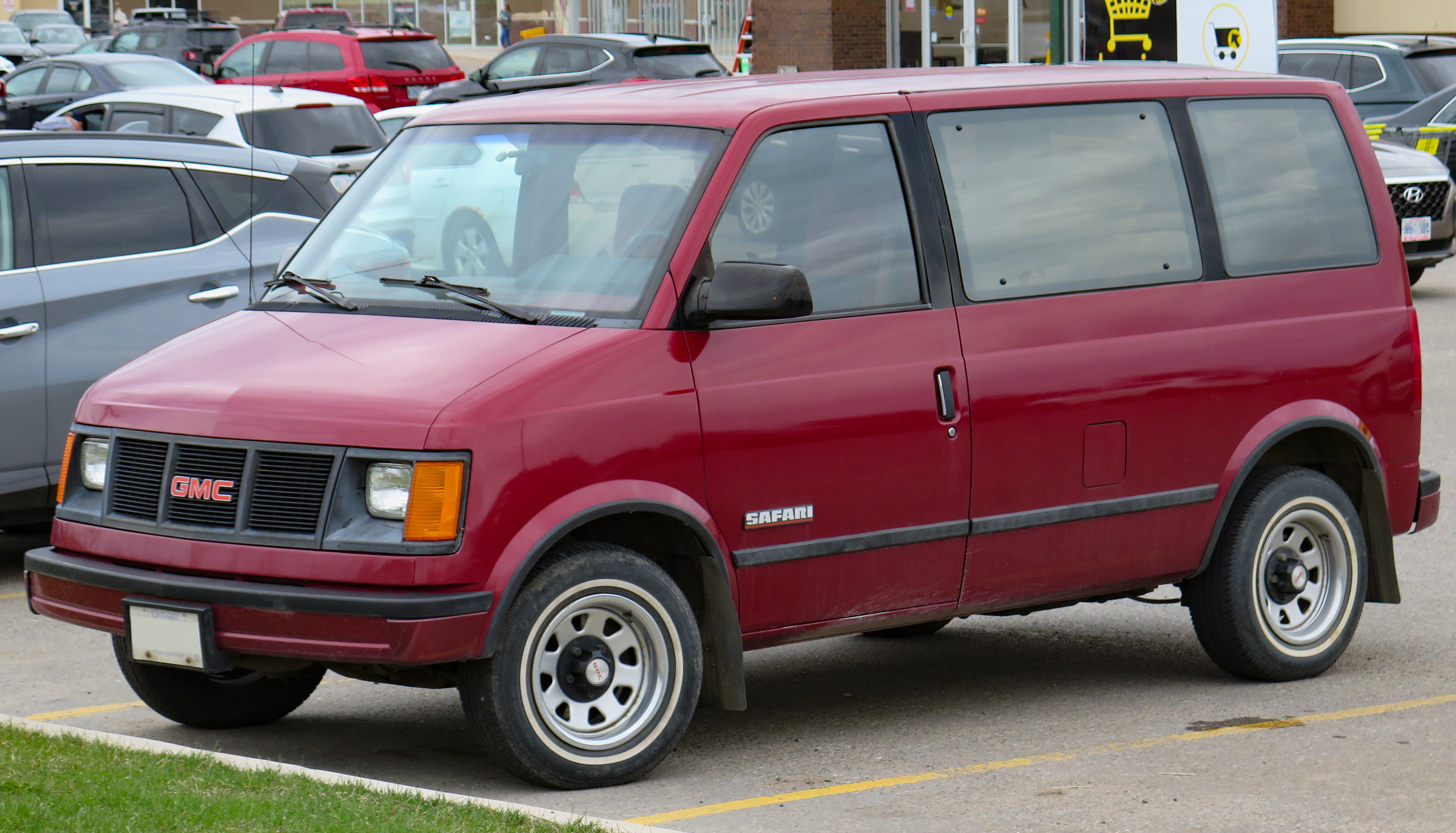
1989 GMC Safari SLX front

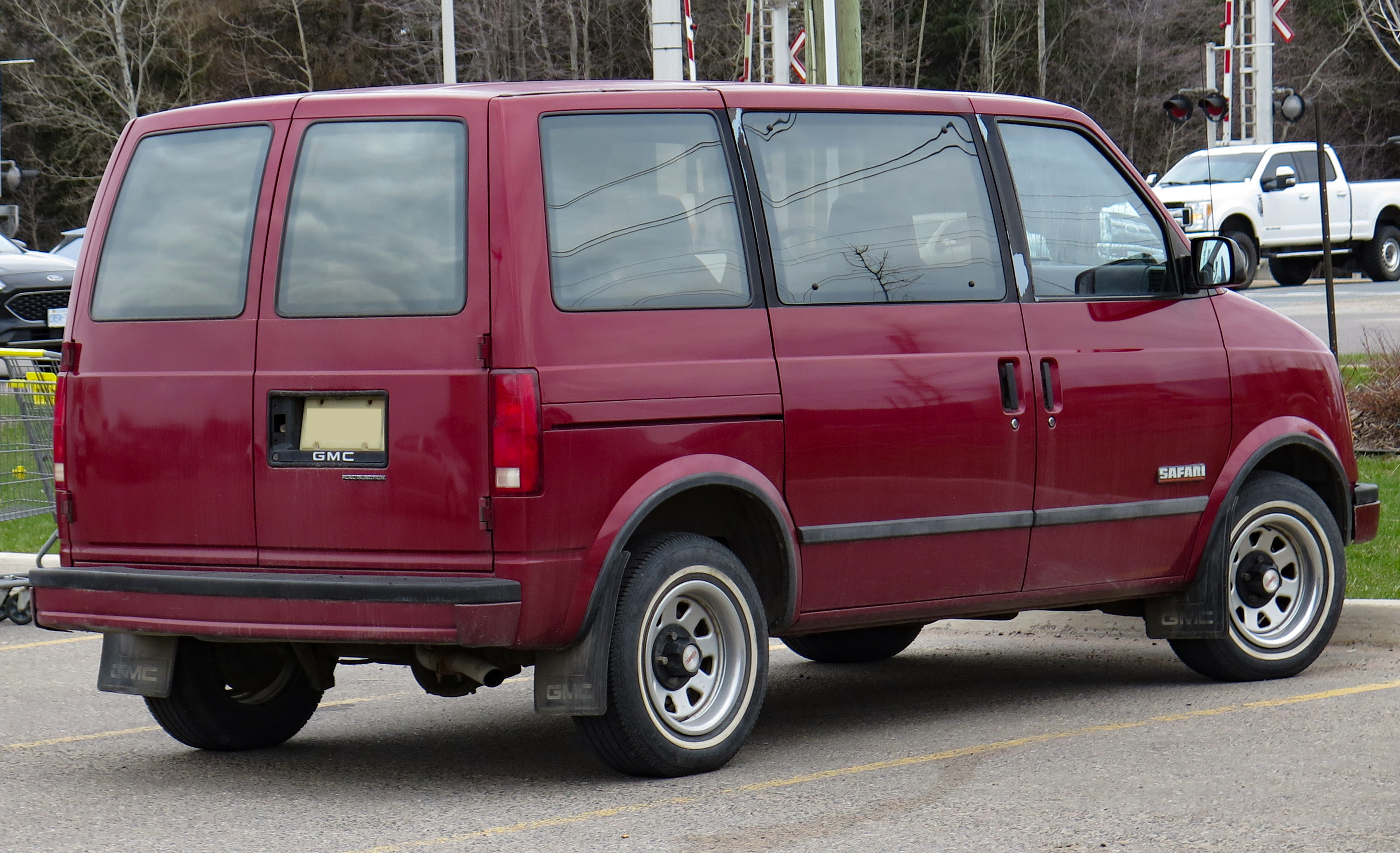
1989 GMC Safari SLX rear

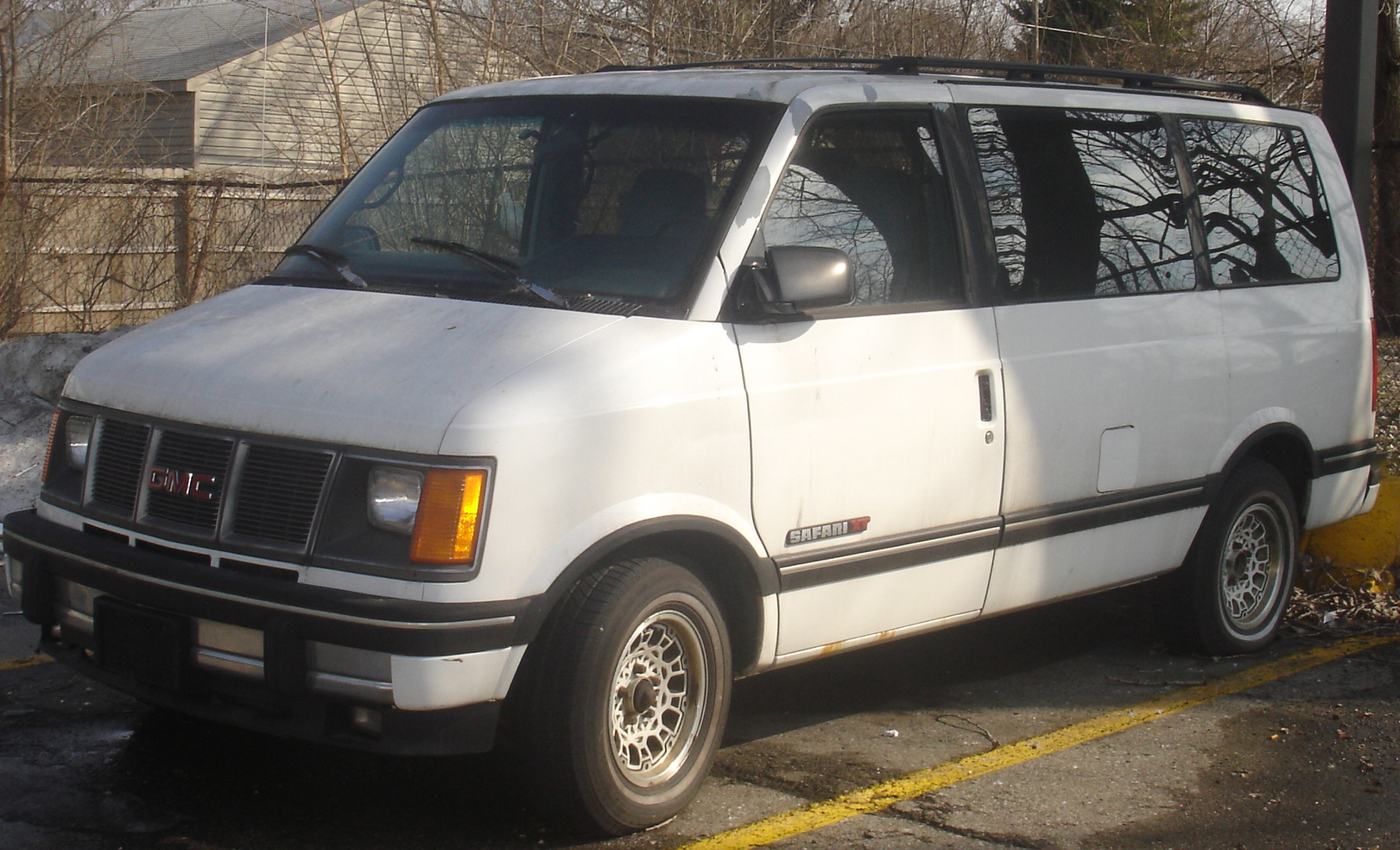
1991–1994 GMC Safari SLE XT (extended body)

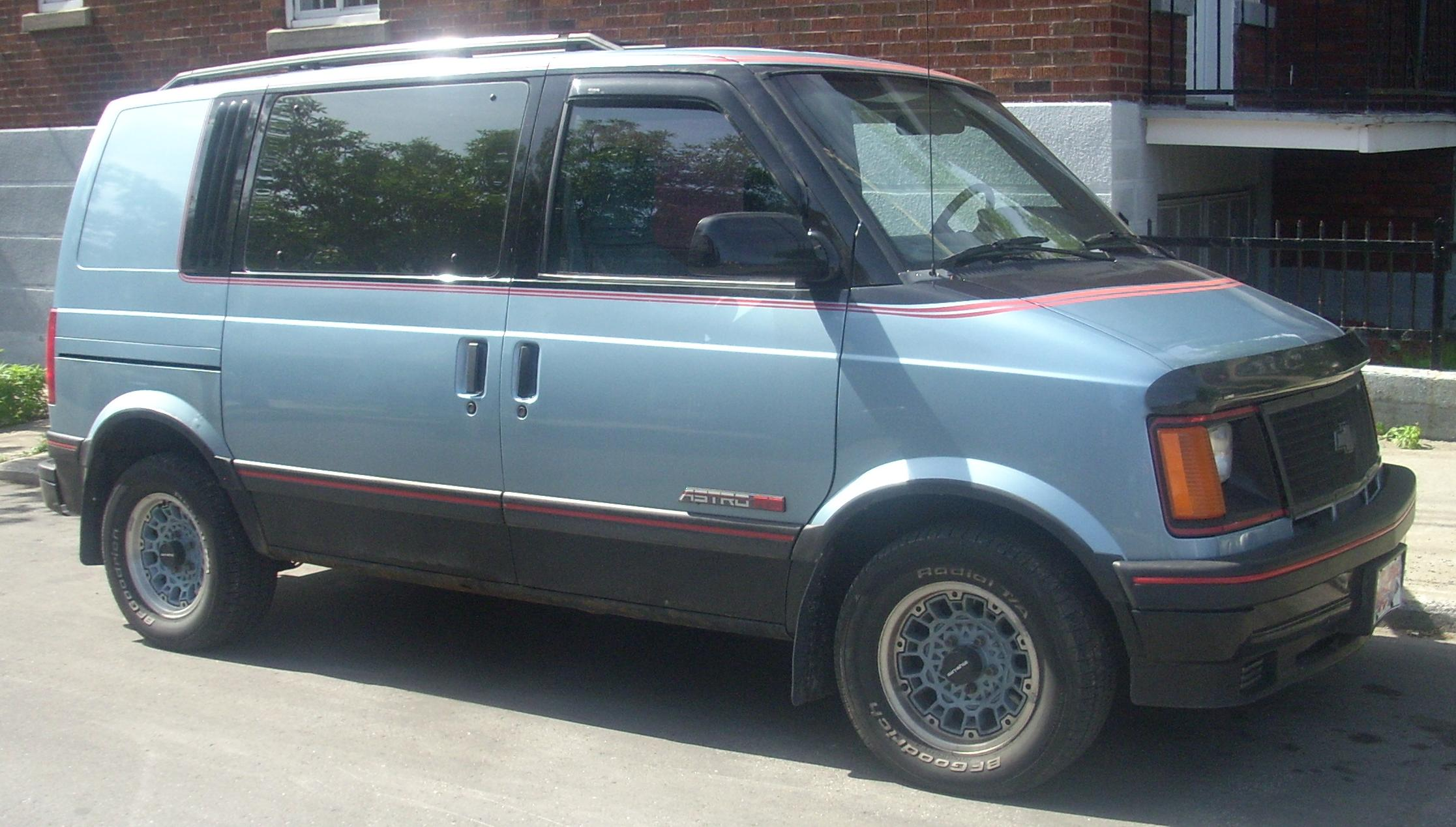
1990–1992 Chevrolet Astro with Sport Package

== Second generation (1995–2005) ==
Second generation
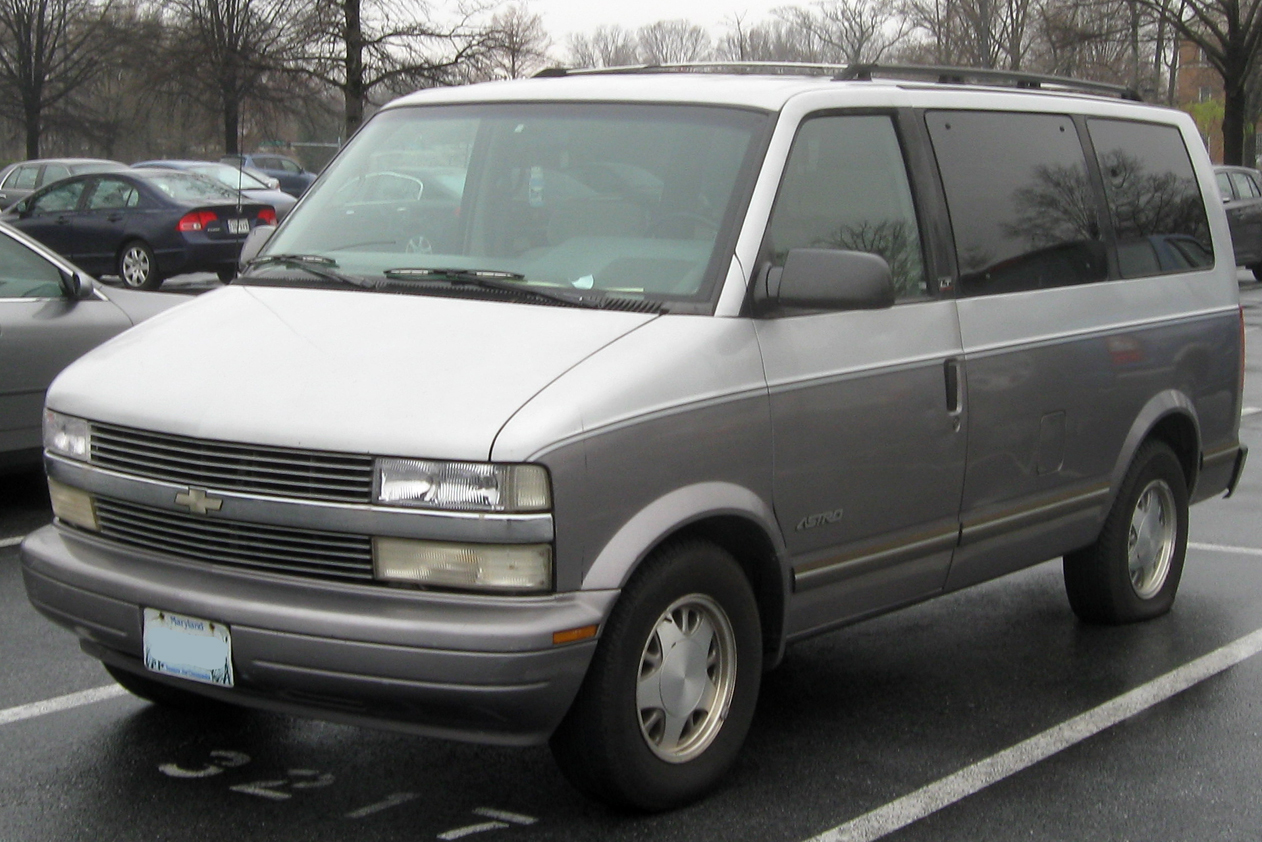
- 1995 Chevrolet Astro

Overview
- Production: 1995 – May 13, 2005

Body and chassis
- Related: GMC Safari

Powertrain
- Engine: 4.3 L 190 hp (142 kW) V6

Dimensions
- Wheelbase: 1995–96: 111.0 in (2,819 mm); 1997–2005: 111.2 in (2,824 mm)
- Length: 189.8 in (4,821 mm)
- Width: 77.5 in (1,968 mm)
- Height: 1995–96 Astro: 75.9 in (1,928 mm); 1997–98 Astro: 76.0 in (1,930 mm); 1995–96 Safari: 76.2 in (1,935 mm); 1997–98/2002–03 Safari Cargo Van & 1999–2001 Astro Cargo Van 2WD: 75.3 in (1,913 mm); 1997–2005 Safari & 2002–05 Astro: 75.0 in (1,905 mm); 1999–2001 Astro 2WD: 74.9 in (1,902 mm); 1999–2001 Astro Cargo Van AWD: 75.2 in (1,910 mm); 1999–2001 Astro AWD: 74.8 in (1,900 mm)

For 1995, the model was facelifted with an extended nose that resembled the then-new full-size Express vans; while the original rectangular sealed-beam headlights were retained for use on lower trim levels, higher-spec models now used horizontally mounted rectangular headlights that had debuted on the full-size trucks in 1988, and would eventually appear on the smaller trucks in 1998. Also for 1995, the short-length body was dropped. In 1996, a redesigned dash received a passenger-side airbag. The vans remained mostly unchanged until the end of production in 2005.

For 2003, GM upgraded the chassis of both the Astro and Safari with certain suspension components, four-wheel disc brakes, and six-lug 16-inch wheels from the full-size Chevrolet and GMC half-ton pickup trucks.

Production in 1998 totaled 32,736 units. However, sales from that point were decreasing and the second-shift production was eliminated in the summer of 2000. Sales of the Astro totaled only 15,709 in 2003, down about 16% from 2002. By 2004, sales of the Chevrolet Astro and GMC Safari vans were in a downward trend, and the cost of upgrading the vans to meet new 2005 safety standards was too high. As a result, production at the Baltimore facility was stopped, with the last example rolling off the assembly line on May 13, 2005.

=== Safety and crash testing ===
For the 1995 model year, GM started manufacturing most of its vehicles, including the Astro and Safari, with CFC-free air conditioning systems, which used R134a refrigerant instead of R-12 refrigerant.

The Insurance Institute for Highway Safety (IIHS), gave the Astro a "Poor" rating in 1996 because of a display of structural failure in the institute's 40 mph (64 km/h) crash test into a fixed, offset barrier. The underbody of the test van buckled, pitching both front seats forward and shoving the crash dummy into the dashboard and steering wheel, resulting in a broken left leg, leading the institute to comment that "[t]he collapse of the occupant compartment left little survival space for the driver."

In testing performed by the National Highway Traffic Safety Administration (NHTSA), however, the Astro and Safari fared better, improving from a single-star rating in 1991 to a three-star (driver) and four-star (passenger) rating by 2000. In side impacts, the Astro and Safari both received the highest, five-star rating in every year that the test was administered.

In 2007, the IIHS reported that the 2001–2004 model year Chevrolet Astro recorded during calendar years 2002–2005 the fewest killed drivers of all passenger vehicles in the United States, as calculated per every million units on the road. Drivers' habits and vehicle usage might have influenced this result.

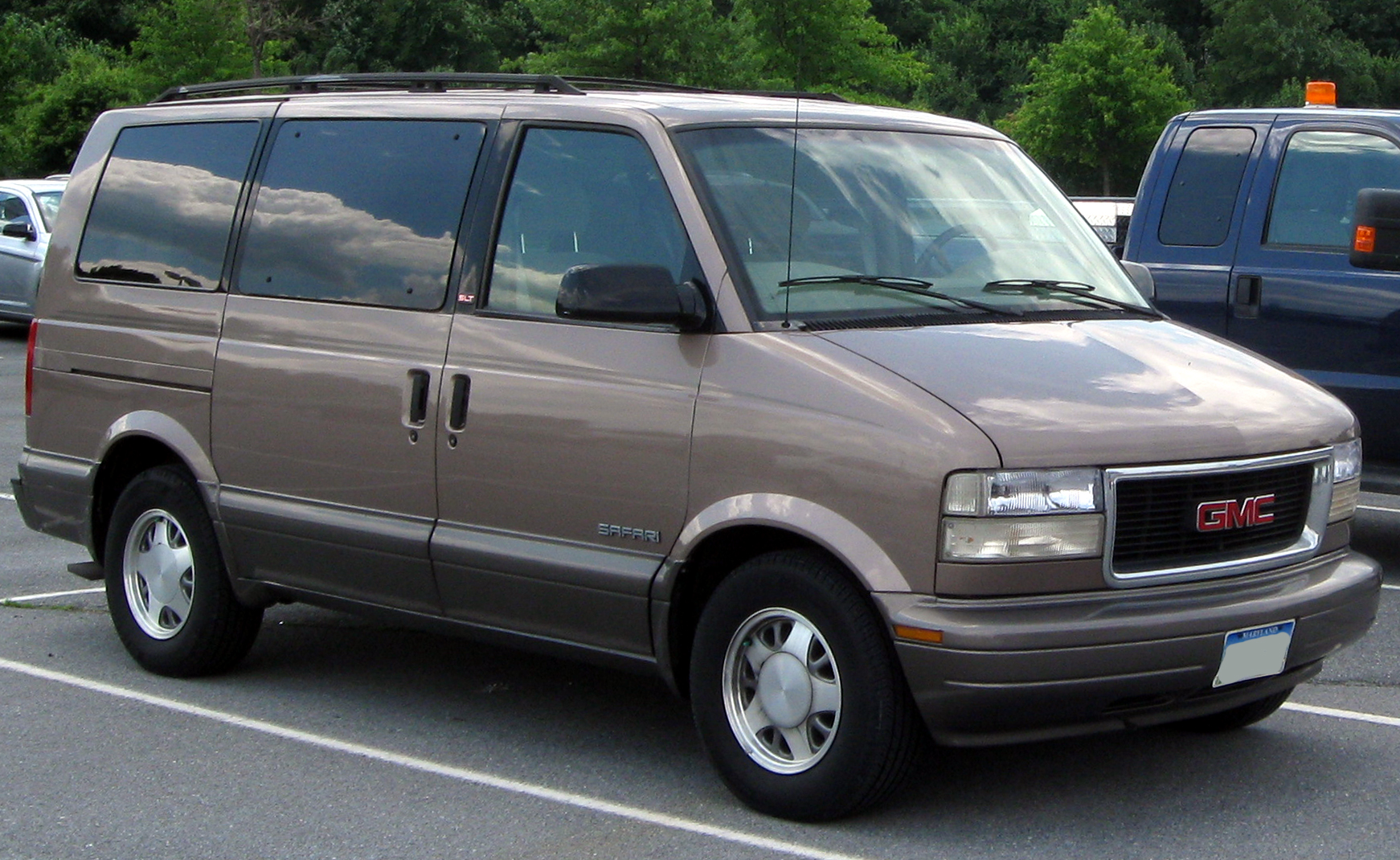
1995–2002 GMC Safari SLT

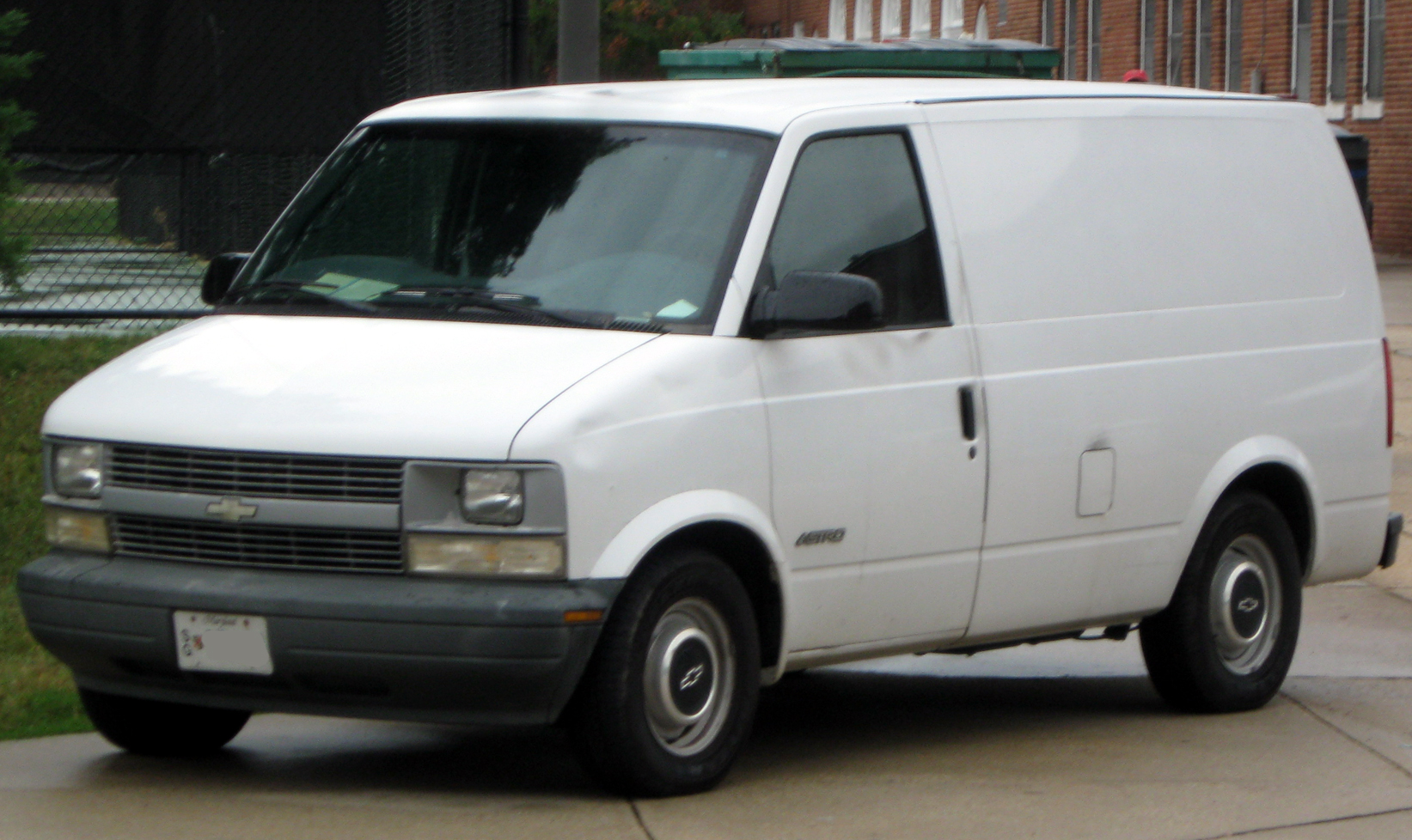
1995–2000 Chevrolet Astro Cargo Van, used by the government of the State of Maryland.

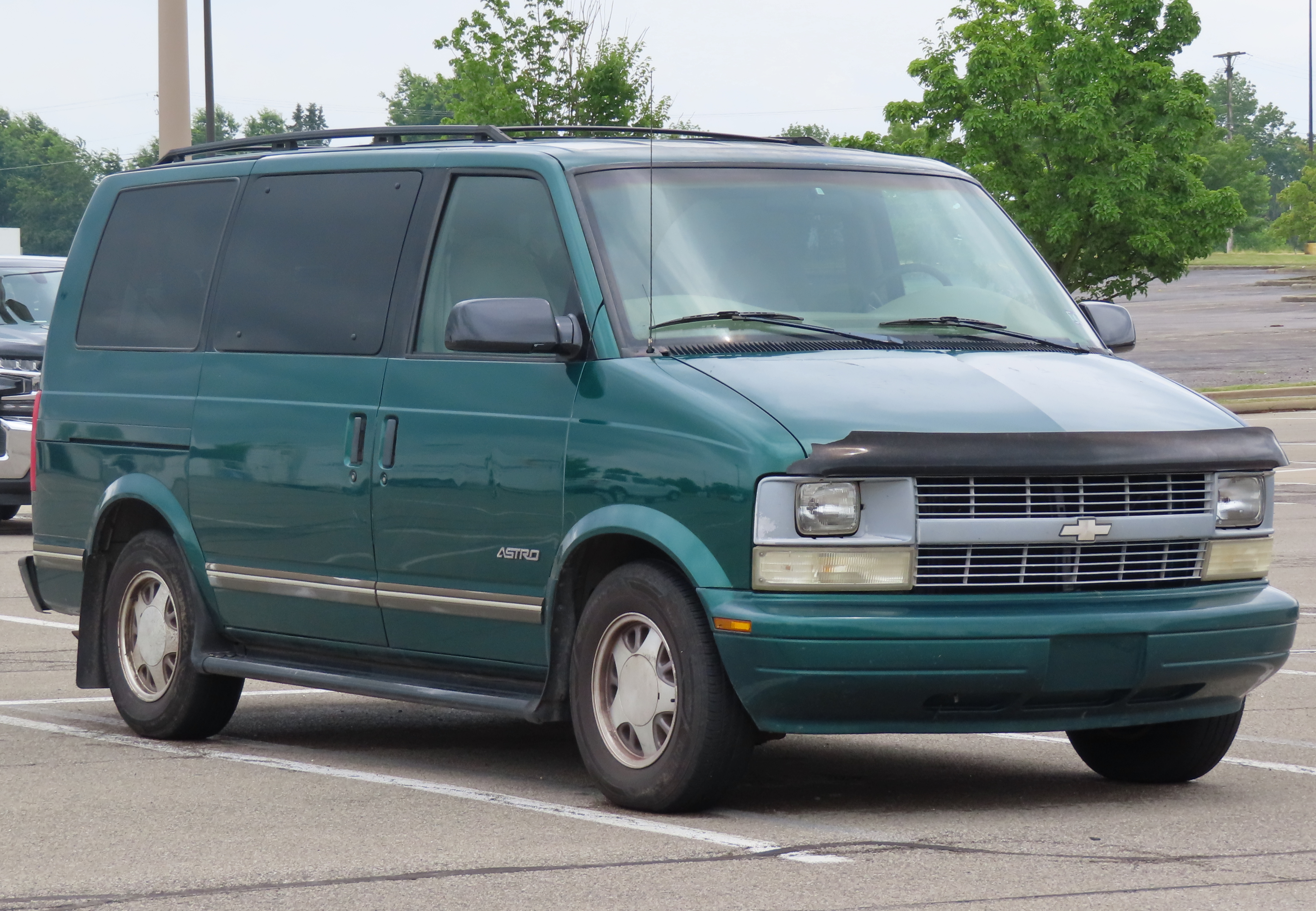
1998 Chevrolet Astro base model, showing standard sealed beam headlights

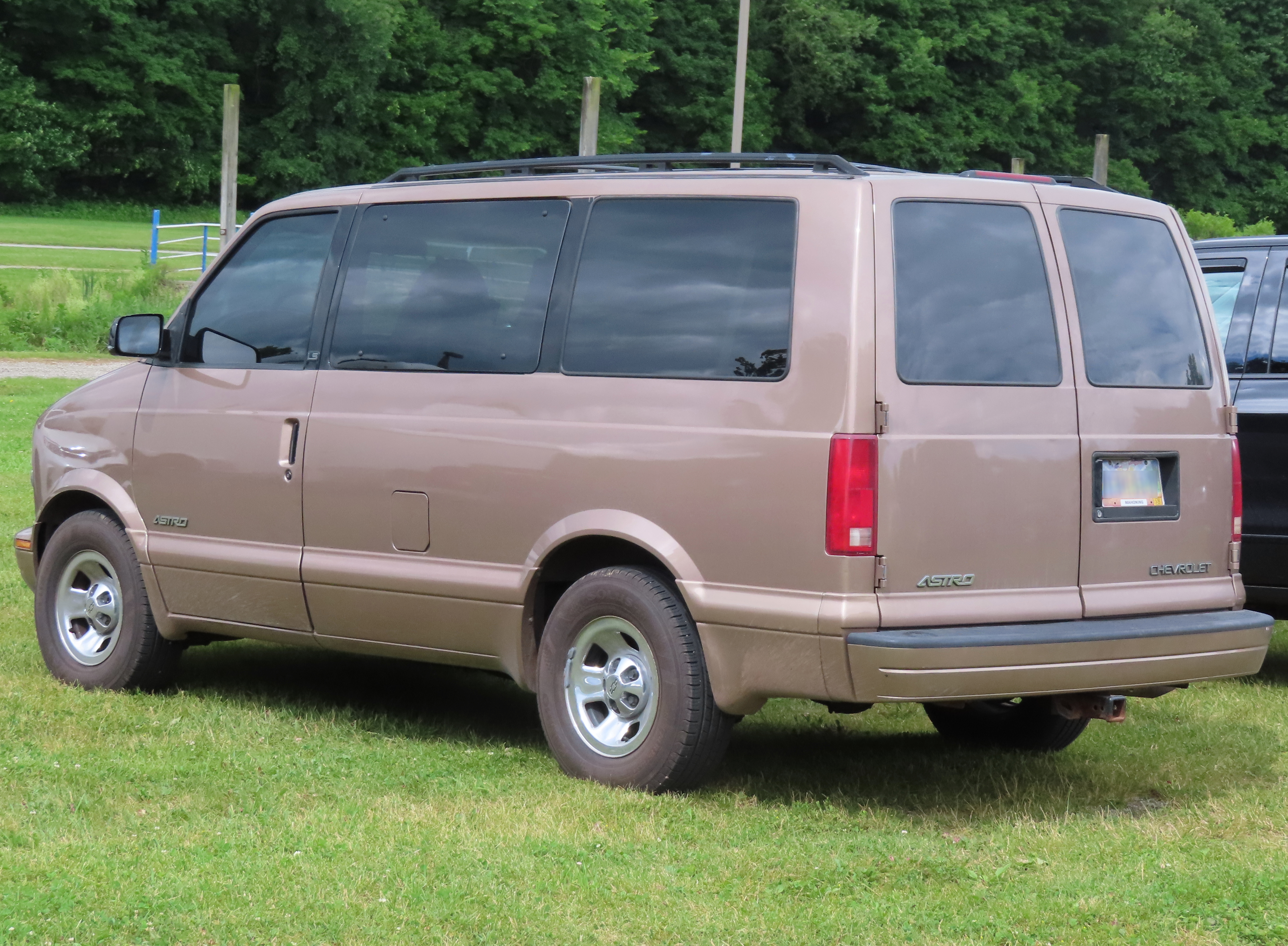
Second generation Chevrolet Astro, rear view
