= The Loom =

Brooklyn based Indie rock band

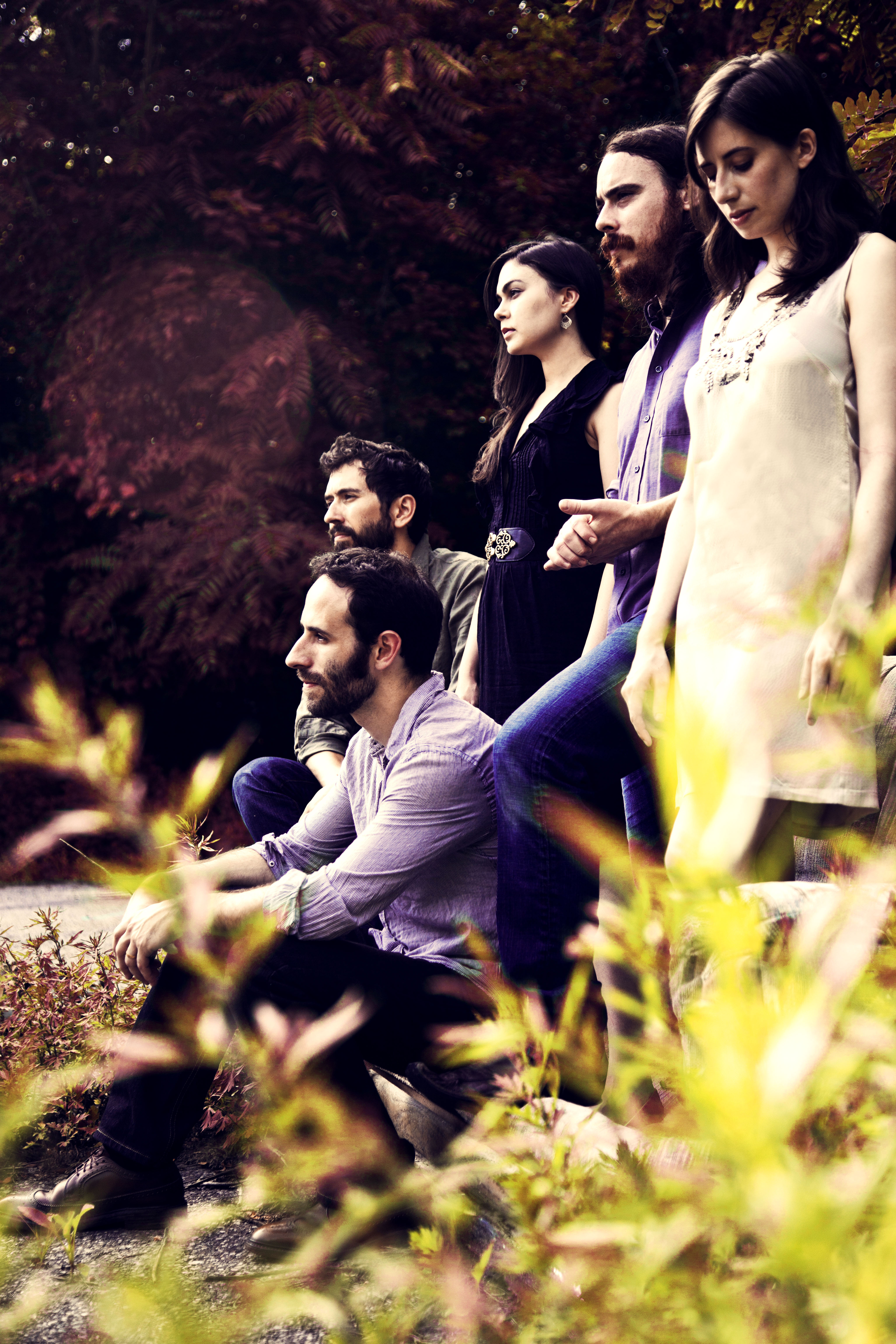

Background information
- Origin: Brooklyn, New York, U.S.
- Genre: indie rock
- Label: Crossbill Records
- Members: John Fanning, Lis Rubard, Jon Alvarez, Dan Desloover
- Website: The Loom

The Loom is a Brooklyn-based indie rock band. Formed in New York City in 2006, the band consists of members playing a variety of instruments, including guitars, mandolin, French horn, trumpet, banjo, ukulele, percussion, keyboards, and male/female vocals.

The band released their debut EP "At Last Light" in 2008 and subsequently went on tour and played Pop Montreal and CMJ Music Festivals. In early 2010 they completed their first full-length album entitled "Teeth", recorded at Maverick Studios in Chinatown, New York, with producer Allen Farmelo and mastered at Masterdisk Studios, with album artwork by Asthmatic Kitty artist DM Stith.

The Loom played 8 shows at SXSW Music Fest 2010, including the Muzzle of Bees Backyard Barbecue with Rural Alberta Advantage, The Love Language, and others. They were featured in Paste Magazine's "Best of What's Next", and of their live show The New Yorker said, "The beloved Loom...have lately been guiding their chamber-folk sound to decidedly louder sonic territory."

In summer and fall of 2010 they toured the Midwest, east coast, and southern US as well as Canada, including CMJ and SXSW Music Festivals. They were called "The Next Big Thing" by The New York Times.

The Loom released their first full-length album, Teeth, on November 1, 2011, on Crossbill Records. The single "For the Hooves that Gallop, And the Heels that March" debuted on NPR with their first music video. The Loom went on an album release tour in fall 2011 in the eastern half of the US, and they are continuing to tour in spring 2012, including the west coast and SXSW as well as other music festivals.

In December 2011, they released a cover of the popular New Year's Eve song Auld Lang Syne, which was featured on The A.V. Club.

== Discography ==
- At Last Light (2008)
- Teeth (2011)
- Here in the Deadlights (2016)
