= The Montague Arms =

Former pub in Lewisham, London, England

Coordinates: 51.473562°N 0.051322°W

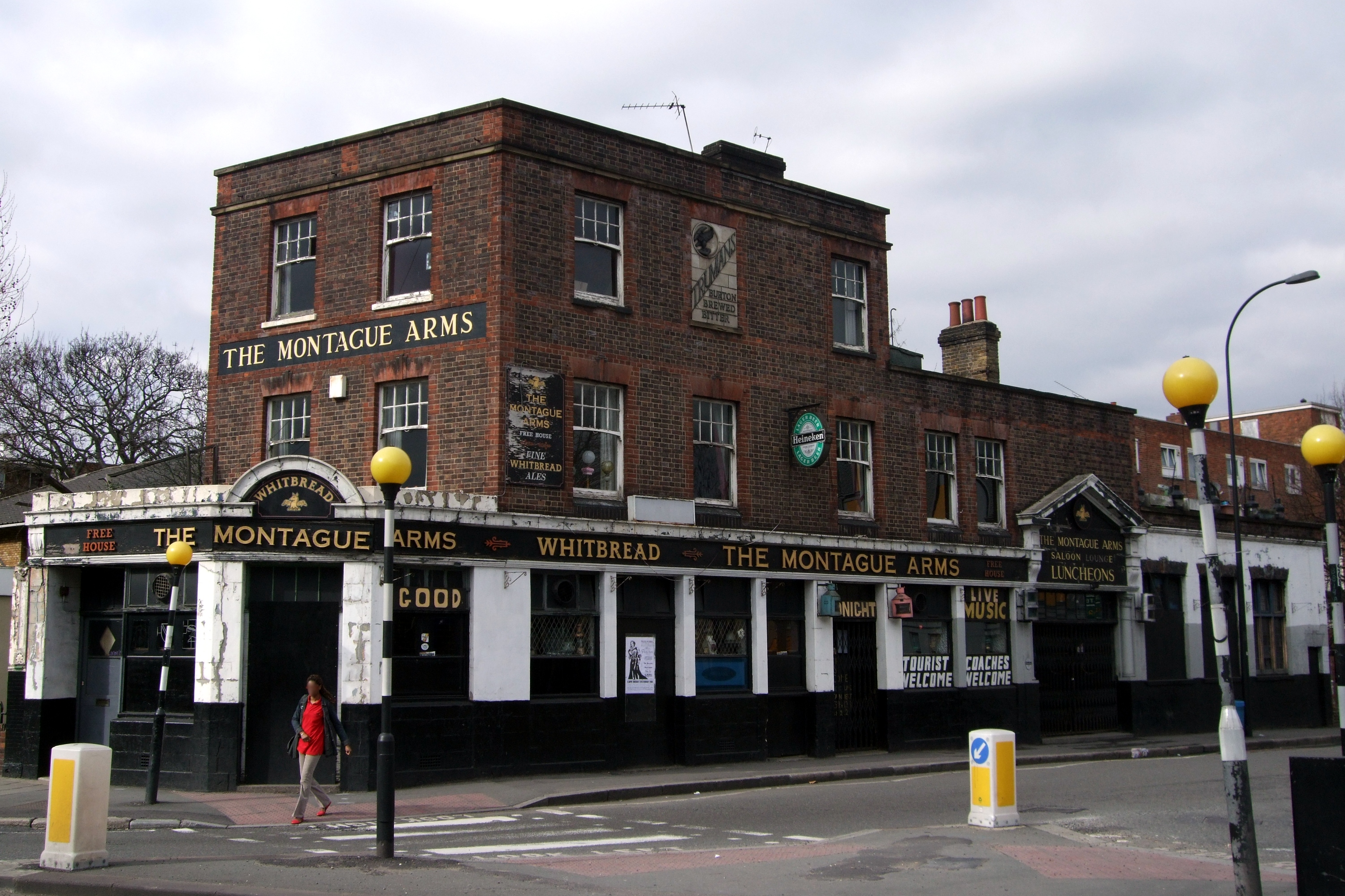
- Interactive map of The Montague Arms
- Location: 289 Queens Rd, Lewisham, London, SE15
- Owner: Peter Hoyle (1967–2014); Noel Gale (2014–2018)
- Capacity: 150
- Events: Punk rock, Indie rock

Construction
- Opened: 1967
- Closed: 2018

The Montague Arms was a music venue located at 289 Queens Road, in the Telegraph Hill ward of Lewisham, on the borders of Peckham and New Cross in south-east London from 1967 until 2018. The pub venue was known for its eccentric decor; which at some point included old fishing-boat lights, a 19th Century carriage containing a stuffed zebra, and an old diving suit.

== History ==
A pub with this name had been situated on Queen's Road since at least 1868, although the current building dates to around 1928-29 and was built by the east London based Truman's Brewery. The Montague Arms was owned by Peter Hoyle from 1967, and managed by Stan and Bet Pownall who ran it until their deaths in 2012. The pub reopened in 2014 under the ownership of Noel Gale.

Whilst in charge Hoyle regularly performed, along with Peter London, as The Two Petes. They covered popular rock and pop songs with London on keyboards and vocals and Hoyle on drums. The duo put out a series of albums recorded live at the venue in the 1970s.

It once bore a sign reading 'Tourists Welcome, Coaches Welcome' as, before the launch of the Eurostar and availability of cheap flights to mainland Europe, it was a regular stopping point for those headed to the ferry at Dover.

In the 1970s and 1980s, as well as live music, the pub also regularly hosted live comedy. Mike Reid, Jimmy Jones and Jim Davidson performed there early in their careers. In Jimmy Jones' autobiography he claims to have been approached by Hoyle and Stan Pownall about performing there and to also have been involved with suggesting bookings for entertainment at the pub "from the very start" when they "didn't even have a stage". He also mentions there being strippers and drag acts performing on a weekly basis, and that The Rolling Stones visited the pub to watch him.

Hoyle is quoted in the Rough Pub Guide remembering Paul McCartney turning up at the pub unannounced at some point in the 1980s. "He'd met Jim Davidson on the plane, and after Jim had told him about the pub, he insisted they come straight from the airport. Paul got up and played a load of hits."

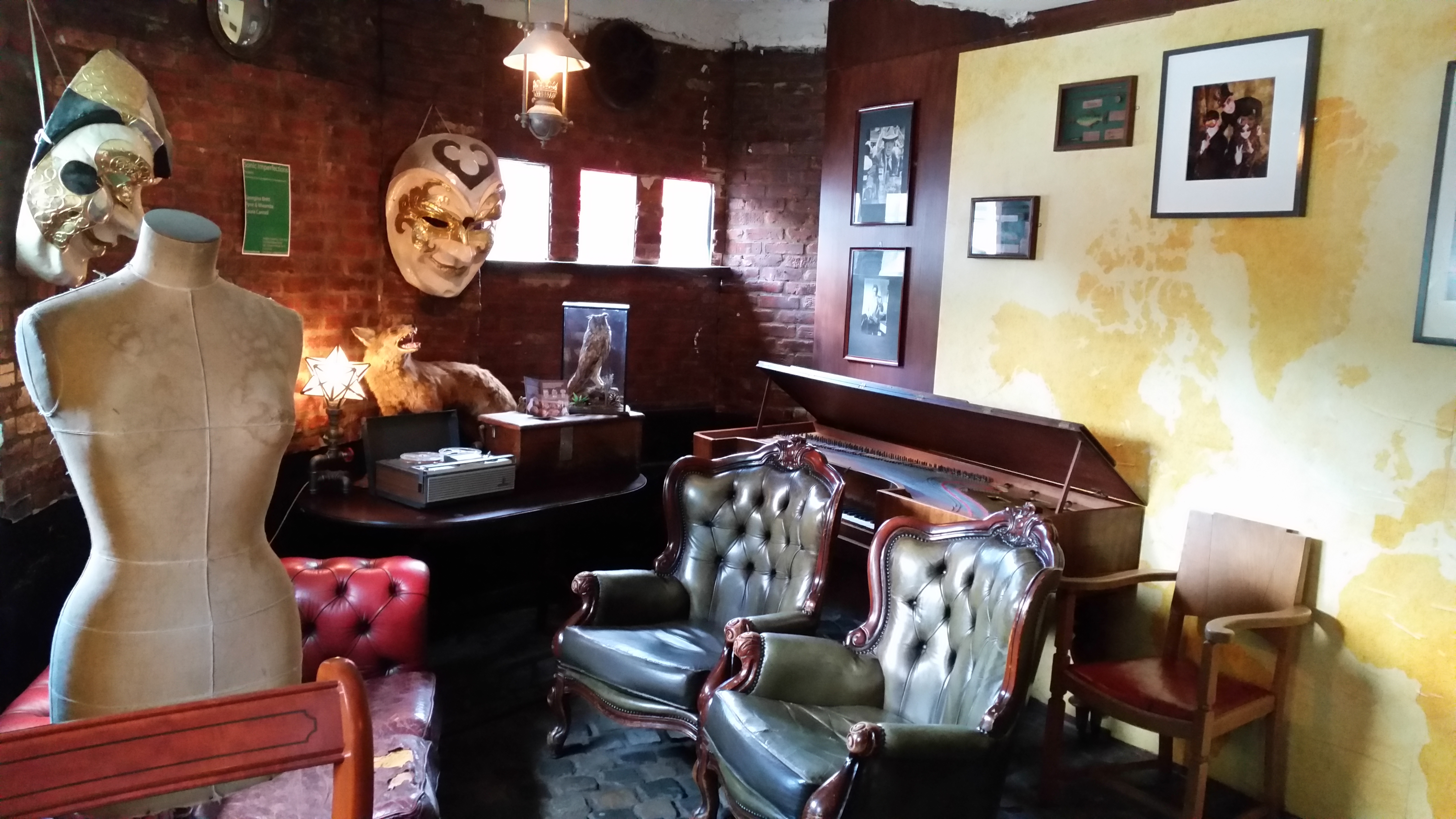
Pub interior, 2014

The pub was the location of a round table interview with Nick Cave, Mark E Smith, and Shane MacGowan published in the NME in 1989. The trio also took part in an impromptu jam session on the pub's small stage with Cave on organ, Smith on guitar and MacGowan on drums.

On 21 January 2005 the seminal Leeds post-punk band Gang of Four played a secret warm up show for their comeback tour with support from Leicestershire post-punk revival band Young Knives. Gigwise described the decor at the time as being like "someone's built a Harvester onboard the pirate ship from The Goonies."

After its first closure in early 2012 a lot of the original décor was sold at auction. The auctioneers listed "numerous ships’ fittings, large-scale models of ships, a vintage diving helmet and boots, a penny-farthing bicycle, tribal artefacts and a range of stuffed animals’ heads, including that of a zebra, which used to gaze out from one of two horse-drawn carriages permanently installed in the pub." The new owner replaced this with other items.

After re-opening in 2014 the venue was often played by bands from the UK DIY punk and indie scenes, as well as occasionally by foreign touring bands. From hardcore punk bands like Good Throb, to more melodic punk rock bands like Big Joanie, RVIVR and Colour Me Wednesday, as well as jazzier post-punk like King Krule and Goat Girl.

In January 2018 the current managers were forced to make some of the pub’s eight bar staff redundant and cancel upcoming gigs at short notice after they were informed that the pub had been sold. A Change.org petition was set up imploring the new owners to keep the venue as a live music venue which received over 9,000 signatures.

For its last three years it was the venue for an independently run LGBTQ+ friendly clubnight called Passionate Necking, as well as a monthly DIY comedy cabaret, Piñata.

In May 2018 the premises was reopened solely as a pub under new management with a "minimalist" aesthetic. Despite the community's expectation that it was going to relaunch as a gastropub following the demolition of its iconic stage, the pub concentrated instead on cocktails and games, such as shuffleboard and table football. The pub failed to draw in enough custom and shut its doors again in July 2019.

The building is still unused, and any possibility of returning it to being a venue was temporarily under threat in early 2021 when a proposal was submitted to knock it down, replacing it with flats and a much smaller pub which would most likely be prohibited from hosting live music. After a flurry of objections from the public, a letter signed jointly by Telegraph Hill ward councillors Paul Bell, Joan Millbank and Luke Sorba was published voicing their own disagreement with the plans.

In February 2023 a new planning application was submitted. This replaced a previous and subsequently withdrawn application from May 2022 that had proposed digging out the basement for use as an entertainment space. The 2023 proposal dropped that part of the plan, with intentions to extend the existing floors for private accommodation and reduce the pub space as a result of utilisation for bicycle and bin storage and a new stairwell, leaving a reduced size function room. The proposal also included conversion of some of the cellar space to a kitchen, paving the way for a future gastropub or restaurant. Permission was granted in November 2023, ending any lingering hopes of the pub returning as a live venue of equal size to before. The application also mentions fitting a sound limiter, which will make any further live music more difficult by cutting power if a certain decibel level is reached.

== Artists to play The Montague Arms ==
- Apologies, I Have None
- Anna Calvi
- Bad Moves
- The Band of Holy Joy
- Big Joanie
- Bromheads Jacket
- Caribou
- Chorusgirl
- Chris Farren
- Colour Me Wednesday
- Crywank
- Dream Nails
- Doe
- The Ethical Debating Society
- Feature
- Fresh
- Gang of Four
- Gnarwolves
- Goat Girl
- Good Throb
- Great Cynics
- Hatcham Social (as The Crowd)
- Happy Accidents
- I, Ludicrous
- Iron Chic
- Johnny Foreigner
- King Krule
- Me Rex
- Muncie Girls
- Pardon Us
- Sauna Youth
- Shopping
- Skinny Girl Diet
- The Smith Street Band
- The Spook School
- RVIVR
- The Violets
- Witching Waves
- Wolf Girl
- Young Knives
