= Exchange, Bristol =

Community-owned music venue in Old Market, Bristol

Coordinates: 51°27′20″N 2°34′58″W

Exchange
- Interactive map of Exchange
- Location: 72 - 73 Old Market, Bristol, BS2
- Capacity: 250

Construction
- Opened: 2012

Exchange is a community-owned music venue in the Old Market area of the city of Bristol, in South West England; it was the first community-owned music venue in the city.

== History ==
The venue opened in August 2012. It was transferred to community ownership by becoming a Community Benefit Society in January 2019 after raising over their target of £250,000 through the selling of shares, making it the first community-owned music venue in the city.

Adam Devonshire of the band Idles was bar manager at the venue for a time before the band took off.

Independent record label Specialist Subject Records opened a record shop upstairs in the venue in August 2017.

During the COVID-19 pandemic, the venue found its challenges continued after restrictions were lifted. In February 2022 they mentioned to BBC News that international artists were pulling events or postponing until spring. In January 2023 the venue announced it would have to reduce opening hours in its cafe/bar due to the current financial climate.

Bristol City Council announced in December 2023 that it had cut arts funding for the venue from April 2024. In February 2025 the venue talked to Bristol24/7 about reducing hire costs for DJ nights and nightclub promoters, as well as appointing a club specific booker, in order to benefit and encourage the local dance music scene.

== Artists which played in the Exchange ==
- Aaron West and the Roaring Twenties
- A Wilhelm Scream
- A Certain Ratio
- The Bug Club
- Bush Tetras
- Callous Daoboys
- Cheerbleederz
- The Chisel
- Conjurer
- Crywank
- Cumgirl8
- Desperate Journalist
- Dillinger Four
- Discharge
- Divide and Dissolve
- Fightmilk
- Fortitude Valley
- Fresh
- Fucked Up
- Gel
- Get Cape. Wear Cape. Fly.
- Glen Matlock
- Hannah Jadagu
- Holy Fuck
- Into It. Over It.
- Jah Wobble
- Johnny Foreigner
- Lydia Lunch
- Macseal
- Martha
- Me Rex
- Melt Banana
- Militarie Gun
- Muncie Girls
- Nervus
- Oi Polloi
- Ozric Tentacles
- Pest Control
- Pete Wylie
- Remember Sports
- Shonen Knife
- Shygirl
- Slaughter Beach, Dog
- Static Dress
- Supermilk
- Svalbard
- Teen Suicide
- Yard Act
