= Supermilk =

British indie rock band

- Origin: London, England
- Genres: Indie rock; alternative rock; post punk; power pop
- Years active: 2017–present
- Labels: Specialist Subject; Sparse City; Keroleen Records
- Members: Jake Popyura; Em Foster; Charlie Jamison; Jason Cavalier
- Past members: Sophie MacKenzie
- Website: supermilk.band

Supermilk are an indie rock band from London, England. Originally the solo project of Jake Popyura, Supermilk have been releasing music since 2017 with a full band incarnation active since 2022.

== History ==
Supermilk released their first EP Hello? Yes this is Supermilk... in 2017 via Keroleen Records. A second EP, Rare Delusions, followed in 2019.

Shortly after the dissolution of Popyura's band Doe, Supermilk announced the release of their debut album. Several live shows were scheduled but later cancelled due to the global coronavirus pandemic. Death Is the Best Thing for You Now was released on 27 March 2020.

Unable to perform live due to the UK's COVID-19 restrictions, Popyura spent 2020 writing Supermilk's second full-length album. Recorded in December the same year with producer Rich Mandell of Me Rex, Four by Three was released via Specialist Subject Records on 2 July 2021. The album was placed at number 2 in Good Morning America's 50 Best Albums of 2021.

Supermilk started performing live in 2022, with Popyura joined by Sophie MacKenzie (Cheerbleederz), Em Foster (Nervus) and Jay Cavalier (Personal Best). A live album, Live from Rad Apples, was released on 15 July 2022 via Specialist Subject Records.

The band released the double single Jessica's Army/Ribcage in May 2023 and were support for the UK leg of Algernon Cadwallader's European tour in June. MacKenzie left the group in November, with Charlie Jamison joining on guitar.

In January 2024 Popyura disclosed his diagnosis of amyotrophic lateral sclerosis (ALS), a rare and terminal neurodegenerative disorder, via the band's Instagram account and in an interview with Kerrang!. Following shows with Speedy Ortiz and Cheekface, Supermilk announced their third LP High Precision Ghosts and shared the album's lead single Sweat. The album was released 9 August 2024 via Specialist Subject Records.

Due to Popyura's ALS progression, Supermilk retired from performing live following the release of Lazy Teenage Boasts, a live video and album recorded in December 2024. The band later released the EP Grief Hospital in June 2026.

== Members ==
=== Current members ===
- Jake Popyura – vocals, bass (2017–present), guitars, drums, synthesiser (2017–2022)
- Em Foster – guitars, vocals (2022–present)
- Jason Cavalier – drums (2022–present)
- Charlie Jamison – guitars (2023–present)

=== Former members ===
- Sophie MacKenzie – guitars, vocals (2022–2023)

== Discography ==
=== Albums ===
- Death Is the Best Thing for You Now, LP (2020) Keroleen Records
- Four by Three, LP/VHS (2021) Specialist Subject Records
- High Precision Ghosts, LP (2024) Specialist Subject Records

=== Live albums ===
- Live from Rad Apples, cassette (2022) Specialist Subject Records
- Lazy Teenage Boasts, VHS (2025) Sparse City

=== EPs ===
- Hello? Yes this is Supermilk..., Mini CD (2017) Keroleen Records
- Rare Delusions, cassette (2019) Keroleen Records
- Grief Hospital, 12" (2026) Specialist Subject Records

=== Singles ===
- Jessica's Army/Ribcage, 7" (2023) Sparse City
- Ocean/Sense, digital (2023) Sparse City
