= The Hard Aches =

Australian punk rock group

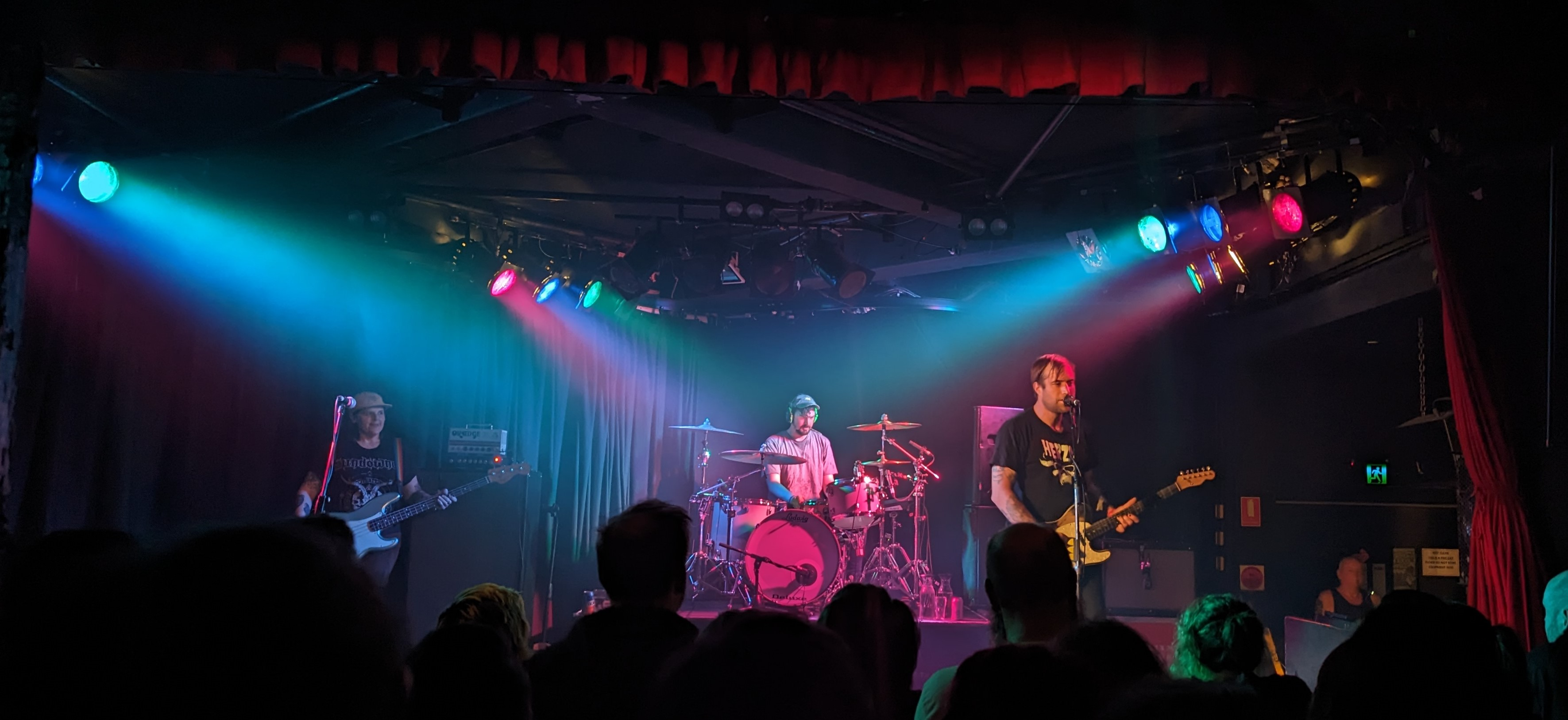
- The Hard Aches, performing at the Corner Hotel, Richmond, June 2023

Background information
- Origin: Adelaide, South Australia
- Genres: Melodic punk; Alternative rock; Indie rock
- Years active: 2012–2024
- Labels: Anchorhead Records; ADA
- Past members: Ben David; Alex Upton; Eb Tonkin; Brianna Mahoney
- Website: thehardaches.com

The Hard Aches were an Australian melodic punk/alternative rock trio formed in 2012 in Adelaide, South Australia. The group consisted of lead singer and guitarist Ben David and drummer Alex Upton for most of their time together, with bassist Eb Tonkin joining for their final few years. Across their 12 years together, the band released three studio albums – Pheromones (2015), Mess (2018) and I Saw the Future (2023) – as well as three EPs.

The Hard Aches were previously signed to their own independent Adelaide punk label, Anchorhead Records (founded by drummer Upton in 2013), and distributed by Warner Music Australia label ADA, but since 2019 were marketed and distributed solely by ADA. The group has toured in support of, and as headliners with other bands including Grinspoon, Luca Brasi, Tired Lion, The Front Bottoms, The Bennies, Teenage Joans, Moose Blood, Camp Cope, and Muncie Girls.

The Hard Aches have been described as "how Courtney Barnett would be if she went rogue after a few too many beers, stopped being so damn loveable and started ranting about past lovers". Their musical style has variously been described as "emo-influenced indie rock", "heartfelt punk-influenced folk", and as "blistering emo, combining the earnestness of Aussie pub rock and biting, sombre lyricism".

In October 2023, the band announced their imminent disbandment after a final tour in January 2024.

== History ==
=== 2012–2015: Early years and Pheromones ===
In 2012, Ben David, who had previously performed as a solo act using the moniker Ben David and the Banned, joined with drummer Alex Upton and bassist Brianna Mahoney (members of his backing band) to form The Hard Aches. A split EP, The Hard Aches / Foxtrot Split was released in February 2013, featuring three Hard Aches songs and three songs from Melbourne punk band Foxtrot. In April 2013, the band opened for the Dropkick Murphys and Frank Turner.

The Hard Aches released their debut EP, Organs & Airports, in November 2013 via Anchorhead Records. The band then parted ways with Mahoney, turning the trio into a duo. From April to June 2014, the band conducted a national 'Organs & Airports Tour', supported by Perth band Lionizer. Around this time, the duo also began writing songs for a future debut album.

In April 2015, The Hard Aches released the single "I Get Like This", and announced the upcoming release of their debut album. "I Get Like This" was positively received by critics, with Triple J Unearthed describing it as "one of the catchiest punk songs of the year". The song went on to become the lead single of the bands debut album, Pheromones, which was released in May 2015. The twelve-track album earned critical acclaim, and spawned a second single, "Knots", with music videos being made for both singles. The band performed a national tour in support of the album from May to June 2015, supported by fellow Adelaide-artist Todd Fogarty. In early June 2015, Triple J Unearthed named the band "Feature Artist of the Week".

In August 2015, The Hard Aches toured again, this time alongside Sydney band HANNAHBAND. In October, a new single, "Loser", was released, shortly before the band undertook a support slot on Australian band The Bennies national tour. In December 2015 and into January 2016 the band supported Australian punk bands Frenzal Rhomb and Clowns on their 'Friendless Summer Tour'.

=== 2016–2017: I Freak Out EP, "Brain Drain", and touring ===
In January and February 2016, The Hard Aches performed a nine-show tour, supported by Melbourne band Camp Cope. In the midst of the tour with Camp Cope, the band also performed on the main stage of the Laneway Festival in Adelaide. In an interview with Finns Magazine, David explained how the band played a show in Canberra one night, Laneway in Adelaide early the next day, and then another show in Sydney that evening: "It was pretty nuts, we ended up doing 3 shows in 3 states (ACT, SA, NSW) in less than 24 hours. It was so much fun but really dumb. Would not recommend!". In mid-February the duo went to Birdland Studios in Melbourne to record their second EP, working with producer Lindsay Gravina (who'd previously worked on albums for The Living End and Magic Dirt) to create the bands first record not managed entirely by David and Upton themselves. At the end of February, the band toured in support of Australian blues rock band The Snowdroppers.

In May 2016, The Hard Aches toured in support of Perth band Tired Lion. Also in May, the band released the single "Glad That You’re Gone", which was added to Triple J's full rotation.

In July 2016, the band headlined at Party Party Party Festival in Adelaide.

In early August 2016, The Hard Aches announced the upcoming release of their second EP, and a national tour to celebrate its release. In late August, the band toured in support of Luca Brasi on their 'If This Is All We're Going to Be Album Tour', alongside English emo band Moose Blood.

In September 2016, the band released their second EP, I Freak Out via Anchorhead Records. The six-track EP featured "Glad That You're Gone" as lead single, and spawned a second single "Gut Full", with both tracks receiving music videos. I Freak Out received positive reviews from critics, and marked the band's first-ever appearance on the ARIA Album Charts, debuting at number 48.

From late September to early November 2016, The Hard Aches toured nationally on their 'I Freak Out EP Tour', supported by Melbourne band Foley. In October 2016, they performed at Yours & Owls Festival in Wollongong.

In January 2017, The Hard Aches supported US-band The Front Bottoms on their Australian tour. In April 2017, the band performed at ShoreShocked Festival, alongside Luca Brasi and Camp Cope. Also in April, the band released a new single "Brain Drain", and announced an upcoming 'Brain Drain Tour'. "Brain Drain" was released digitally, and also as a split 7-inch single with UK band Muncie Girls.

During the middle of 2017, the band took a short break from music, to recover from the mental and physical toll of two years of relentless touring.

In June 2017, The Hard Aches toured nationally on the first part of their 'Brain Drain Tour', supported by UK band Muncie Girls, and Melbourne band The Football Club.

In August 2017, the band toured in support of Australian punk band Trophy Eyes, alongside British punk band Trash Boat.

Recording of a second album began in early September 2017, with Melbourne producer Sam Johnson, at his studio 'Holes and Corners'. The album was recorded over three weeks, with the band working six-day weeks, then flying out to play live on weekends. In late September, the band toured nationally with the 'Brain Dead Tour', part two of their 'Brain Drain Tour'.

=== 2018: Mess ===
In January 2018, The Hard Aches performed a small, four-show tour, featuring support acts including Antonia & The Lazy Susans, Bugs, Eliza & The Delusionals, and Stabbitha & The Knifey Wifeys. In late January, the band released a new single, "Mess". The single premiered on Triple J's show Good Nights, where the band announced it as the title track of their upcoming second album, and also announced an upcoming national tour to support the release of the album.

In March 2018, the band released "Happy", the second single from their second album, which features guest vocals from Camp Cope vocalist/guitarist Georgia "Maq" McDonald. Also in March, country music legend Billy Ray Cyrus tweeted a picture of a Hard Aches tour poster and wrote "great band."

On 13 April 2018, The Hard Aches released their second album, Mess. Featuring guest vocals from Georgia Maq of Camp Cope, Craig Selak (formerly of The Bennies), and Jeff Rosenstock, the twelve-track album earnt critical acclaim, and debuted on the ARIA Album Charts at number 36. The band kicked off their album tour the same day Mess released, performing seven shows nationally, with support from Antonia & The Lazy Susans, and Sincerely, Grizzly.

In September 2018, The Hard Aches released a music video for their song "I Feel Like I'm Dying". In late September and early October 2018, the band toured the UK as support for the Muncie Girls on their 'Fixed Ideals Tour', and also headlined some shows of their own.

In October and November 2018, The Hard Aches toured Australia again, this time playing a nine-show tour, supported by Brisbane band Bugs and Melbourne trio Face Face. In late-November and December, the band toured in support of Frank Turner & the Sleeping Souls on the Australia and New Zealand leg of their 'Be More Kind World Tour'.

=== 2019–2024: I Saw The Future and disbandment ===
In January 2019, The Hard Aches released a music video for their song "Happy". In April and May 2019, the band performed a UK/EU tour, playing shows across the UK and Germany, and festivals such as the Manchester Punk Festival in the UK, and Obenuse Festival in Switzerland.

In June 2019, the band performed a ten-show headline tour of Australia, supported by Brisbane band Major Leagues.

In September 2019, The Hard Aches released a new single, "Wasted", via ADA. Frontman Ben David stated: "Wasted follows my own personal journey of getting sober, a journey I’ve been on for about a year now. It’s been a long journey to get to the point I’m at now, where I feel truly happy with the decision I’ve made. I couldn’t feel stronger about advocating for safe and healthy environments for us all to celebrate our mutual love for music in.” "Wasted" features Major Leagues' bassist Vlada Edirippulige, and was recorded with producer Sam Johnson, and mastered by Brian Lucey from Magic Garden Mastering. Alongside the release, the band announced that they were planning to head back into the studio in 2020 to record a brand new album due for release later in the year.

In October and November 2019, the band toured in support of Australian band Grinspoon, alongside Newcastle band The Gooch Palms, and Bugs.

In December 2019, frontman Ben David was personally affected by the bushfires that burnt through his hometown of Cudlee Creek near Adelaide, during the Cudlee Creek fire.

In January 2020, The Hard Aches performed alongside Hightime, Teenage Joans, and Stabbitha & The Knifey Wifeys to raise money for South Australian charities and emergency services responding to the Black Summer bushfires.

In June 2021, the band played their first show since the beginning of the coronavirus pandemic, a one-off performance in Adelaide.

In April 2022, The Hard Aches released a new single, "Party Ghost", via ADA. Featuring guest vocals from Teenage Joans' Cahli Blakers, "Party Ghost" also marked the bands first release with new member Eb Tonkin. Alongside the release of "Party Ghost", the band also announced an upcoming national tour, and that the song will serve as the lead single on their forthcoming third album.

In July and August 2022, the band toured nationally on the 'Party Ghost Tour', with support from Cheap Date, SCABZ, The Sleepyheads and Suzi. In early July, the band was forced to cancel the NSW and ACT leg of the tour, due in part to sickness and flooding in NSW. Also in July, The Hard Aches released a music video for "Party Ghost".

In December 2022, The Hard Aches continued the previously cancelled leg of their 'Party Ghost Tour', with performances in Sydney, Newcastle and the Gold Coast. After finishing the three-show tour, the band teased the upcoming release of their third album in 2023.

On 8 March 2023, the band announced the upcoming release of their third album, I Saw The Future, and an upcoming tour in support of the album. On 10 March 2023, the band released "Jetlag", the second single from I Saw The Future, and on 12 April 2023, released "Twists & Bends", a third single. I Saw The Future released on 5 May 2023.

Concert poster advertising The Hard Aches final Melbourne show at the Northcote Social Club

In October 2023, the band announced their upcoming final tour, the eleven-show 'See Ya'll Laters Tour', after which they would be dissolving after more than a decade of existence.

On 8 January 2024, the Hard Aches released their fourth album Leftovers: Singles, B - Sides & Demos, a chronologically ordered journey from 2012 to 2024 featuring 19 songs including un-released songs from Mess and I Saw The Future, previously released singles, and alternate versions of songs.

== Other ventures ==
=== Side projects ===
Since 2010, David has released several solo albums and EPs, including two EPs under the moniker of Ben David and the Banned.

From 2013, Upton ran independent record label Anchorhead Records, which has released music for The Hard Aches, and other artists including Foley, Bec Stevens and The Flying So High-Os.

Tonkin also plays bass for Adelaide punk band Stabbitha and the Knifey Wifeys.

=== Activism ===
The band supported Camp Cope's 2016 campaign dedicated to preventing and reporting incidents at concerts and festivals called It Takes One, donning 'The Person Wearing This T-shirt Stands Against Sexual Assault And Demands A Change' shirts in support. The band has also expressed support for the International Day Against Homophobia, Biphobia and Transphobia, School Strike for Climate movement, and the Aboriginal land rights movement.

Both David and Upton are vegan.

== Influences ==
David has stated that he is influenced by music and musicians he heard growing up, including Billy Bragg, The Clash, and The Living End's self-titled debut album.

== Discography ==
=== Studio albums ===
List of studio albums, with release date, label and selected chart positions shown
Title	Album details	Peak chart positions
Title	Album details	AUS
Pheromones	Released: 22 May 2015; Label: Anchorhead Records (ANCO16); Format: CD, LP, digital download, streaming	—
Mess	Released: 13 April 2018; Label: Anchorhead Records (ANCO28V); Format: CD, LP, digital download, streaming media	36
I Saw The Future	Released: 5 May 2023; Label: ADA; Format: LP, digital download, streaming media	—

=== Compilation albums ===
List of studio albums, with release date and label
Title	Album details
Leftovers: Singles, B - Sides & Demos	Released: 8 January 2024; Label: Independent; Format: Digital download, streaming media

=== Extended plays ===
List of extended plays, showing title, details and notes
Title	Details	Peak chart positions
Title	Details	AUS
The Hard Aches / Foxtrot Split (with Foxtrot)	Released: 2 February 2013; Label: Anchorhead Records; Format: Digital download, streaming	—
Organs & Airports	Released: 8 November 2013; Label: Anchorhead Records; Format: 12-inch EP, Digital download, streaming	—
I Freak Out	Released: 9 September 2016; Label: Anchorhead Records (ANCO22V); Format: 12-inch EP, CD, Digital download, streaming	48

=== Singles ===
List of singles, with year released and album name shown
Title	Year	Album / EP	Details
"Die Young, Die Happy"	2013	Restless Years: Volume One (Compilation album)	Released: 27 July 2013; Label: No label (Independent release); Format: Digital download, streaming
"Whose Line Is It Anyway? (Acoustic)"	2014	Tearjerkers For Jerks (Compilation album)	Released: 2 July 2014; Label: Age Crisis Records; Format: CS, digital download, streaming
"I Get Like This"	2015	Pheromones	Released: 16 April 2015; Label: Anchorhead Records; Format: Digital download, streaming
"Knots"	2015	Pheromones	Released: 2 July 2015; Label: Anchorhead Records; Format: Digital download, streaming
"Loser"	2015	Non-album single	Released: 16 October 2015; Label: Anchorhead Records; Format: Digital download, streaming
"Glad That You're Gone"	2016	I Freak Out	Released: 8 May 2016; Label: Anchorhead Records; Format: Digital download, streaming
"Brain Drain"	2017	The Hard Aches / Muncie Girls Split	Released: 12 April 2017; Label: Anchorhead Records; Format: 7-inch, Digital download, streaming
"Mess"	2018	Mess	Released: 31 January 2018; Label: Anchorhead Records; Format: Digital download, streaming
"Happy"	2018	Mess	Released: 26 March 2018; Label: Anchorhead Records; Format: Digital download, streaming
"Wasted"	2019	Non-album single	Released: 27 September 2019; Label: ADA; Format: Digital download, streaming
"Party Ghost"	2022	I Saw The Future	Released: 27 April 2022; Label: ADA; Format: Digital download, streaming
"Jetlag"	2023	I Saw The Future	Released: 10 March 2023; Label: ADA; Format: Digital download, streaming
"Twists & Bends"	2023	I Saw The Future	Released: 12 April 2023; Label: ADA; Format: Digital download, streaming

=== Music videos ===
Year	Title	Album / EP	Director	Reference
2015	"I Get Like This"	Pheromones	—	
2015	"Knots"	Pheromones	Bare Pictures	
2015	"Loser"	Non-album single	Kieran Ellis-Jones	
2016	"Glad That You're Gone"	I Freak Out	Kieran Ellis-Jones	
2016	"Gut Full"	I Freak Out	Kerinne Jenkins	
2017	"Brain Drain"	The Hard Aches / Muncie Girls Split	Kieran Ellis-Jones	
2018	"I Feel Like I'm Dying"	Mess	Kieran Ellis-Jones	
2019	"Happy"	Mess	Bad Seed Agency	
2022	"Party Ghost"	I Saw The Future	Kieran Ellis-Jones	
