= Mess (The Hard Aches album) =

2018 album by The Hard Aches

Studio album by The Hard Aches
- Released: 13 April 2018
- Recorded: September 2017
- Studio: Holes and Corners, Melbourne, VIC
- Genre: Alternative rock, punk rock
- Length: 36:31
- Label: Anchorhead Records; ADA
- Producer: Sam Johnson

The Hard Aches chronology
Pheromones (2015)	Mess (2018)	I Saw The Future (2023)

Singles from Mess
- 1. "Mess" Released: 31 January 2018; 2. "Happy" Released: 26 March 2018

Mess is the second studio album by Australian melodic punk/alternative rock band The Hard Aches, released on 13 April 2018 by Anchorhead Records. It was produced by Sam Johnson and recorded at Holes and Corners in Melbourne in September 2017.

== Background and promotion ==
Mess was recorded in September 2017, over three weeks, with the band working six-day weeks, then flying out to play live on weekends. In late January 2018, the band released a new single, "Mess". The single premiered on Triple J's show Good Nights, where the band announced it as the title track of their upcoming second album, and also announced an upcoming national tour to support the release of the album.

In March 2018, the band released "Happy", the second single from the album, which features guest vocals from Camp Cope vocalist/guitarist Georgia "Maq" McDonald.

On 13 April 2018, The Hard Aches released Mess, their second album. The band kicked off their album tour the same day Mess released, performing seven shows nationally.

== Critical reception ==
Professional ratings
Review scores
Source	Rating
Beat Magazine	8.5/10
Hysteria Magazine	6/10

The album received positive reviews. The AU Review gave the album a positive review and said it was "a career-defining effort from The Hard Aches." Kill Your Stereo praised the album, describing it as an: "utter belter of a record, the kind of killer album that I have been hoping The Hard Aches would make for a long while now". Beat Magazine gave the album a positive review and said: "shining with raw honesty, The Hard Aches prove that they’ve found their unique rhythm." In another positive review, Upside Adelaide wrote, "This is an album that will make you feel something, but it will also sweep you up and have you singing along." Hysteria Magazine were less enthused, stating "The Hard Aches deliver in skillful songwriting but their minimal instrumentation doesn’t quite satisfy".

== Track listing ==
Track listing adapted from BandCamp.

No.	Title	Length
1.	"Mess"	3:48
2.	"Get Outta My House"	3:16
3.	"Happy"	3:02
4.	"Friendship"	2:59
5.	"Warm Blooded"	3:02
6.	"Terrible Things"	3:07
7.	"Outline"	2:22
8.	"Grinding My Teeth"	2:33
9.	"I Feel Like I'm Dying"	2:20
10.	"On The Mend"	2:11
11.	"Kat's Song III"	3:31
12.	"Family"	4:20
Total length:		36:31

== Personnel ==
The Hard Aches

- Ben David – lead vocals, guitar
- Alex Upton – drums

Additional musicians

- Georgia McDonald – guest vocals on "Happy" and "Family"
- Jeff Rosenstock – guest vocals on "Friendship"
- Craig Selak (formerly of The Bennies) – guest vocals on "Outline"
- Sam Johnson – guest vocals on "Terrible Things"
- Dougie Rankin – trombone on "I Feel Like I'm Dying" and "Family"

Production

- Sam Johnson – producer and mixing
- William Bowden – mastering

Design

- Annie Walter – artwork
- Jay Wennington – photography
- Matt Walter – photography

== Charts ==
Chart (2018)	Peak position
Australian Albums (ARIA)	36

== Release history ==
Region	Date	Label	Format	Catalog
Australia	13 April 2018	Anchorhead Records	CD, digital download, streaming	ANC028C
Australia	13 April 2018	Anchorhead Records	LP	ANC028V
