= Nothing Sticks =

Studio album by Pictoria Vark
- Released: March 21, 2025
- Studios: Big Nice Studio, Lincoln, Rhode Island
- Genre: Indie rock
- Length: 33:52
- Label: Get Better

Pictoria Vark chronology
The Parts I Dread (2022)	Nothing Sticks (2025)

Nothing Sticks is the second studio album by American singer-songwriter Pictoria Vark. It was released on March 21, 2025, via Get Better Records in LP, cassette, CD and digital formats.

== Reception ==
Professional ratings
Review scores
Source	Rating
Rolling Stone	4/5 stars
Spectrum Culture	72%
Under the Radar	7/10 stars

Taylor Ruckle of Flood Magazine remarked, "Nothing Sticks reflects on the transitory nature of everything—a blessing, a curse, or just a statement of fact depending on where you stand." In a seven-star review for Under the Radar, Mark Moody commented, "Park's lyrics are sometimes openly frank and other times poetically close to the vest, but what is always clear is the depth of her sincerity."

The album received a rating of 72% from Spectrum Culture's Anna Solomon, who opined, "The record feels longer than it really is, and the writing is occasionally unmemorable, but enough tracks really nail the delicate balance between raw energy and more lush arrangements to make it a worthwhile listen." Assigning the album a four-star rating, Rob Sheffield of Rolling Stone referred to it as a "perfect springtime road-trip indie-rock album full of soft-spoken guitar haze and emotional travelogues."

== Track listing ==
Nothing Sticks track listing
No.	Title	Length
1.	"Sara"	3:12
2.	"No One Left"	2:27
3.	"San Diego"	2:13
4.	"I Sing What I See"	3:14
5.	"I Pushed It Down"	2:19
6.	"Make Me a Sword"	2:57
7.	"Lucky Superstar"	4:30
8.	"Where It Began"	4:51
9.	"Other Things"	4:33
10.	"We're Musicians"	3:36
Total length:		33:52

== Personnel ==
Credits adapted from Bandcamp.

- Victoria Park – bass guitar, vocals, backing vocals, additional guitar (tracks 3, 9)
- Gavin Caine – drums, percussion, piano, organ, synth, backing vocals, additional guitar, autoharp (tracks 5, 8), synth bass (track 7)
- Tori Hall – guitar, bowed guitar, backing vocals (track 9)
- Bradford Krieger – synth bass (track 1), lap steel (track 9), backing vocals (tracks 9, 10)
- JB Fulbright – cello (tracks 3, 5, 7, 10)
- Katie Jacoby – violin, viola (tracks 3, 5)
- Nate Williams – trumpet (tracks 1, 4)
