= Petrol Girls =

English punk rock band

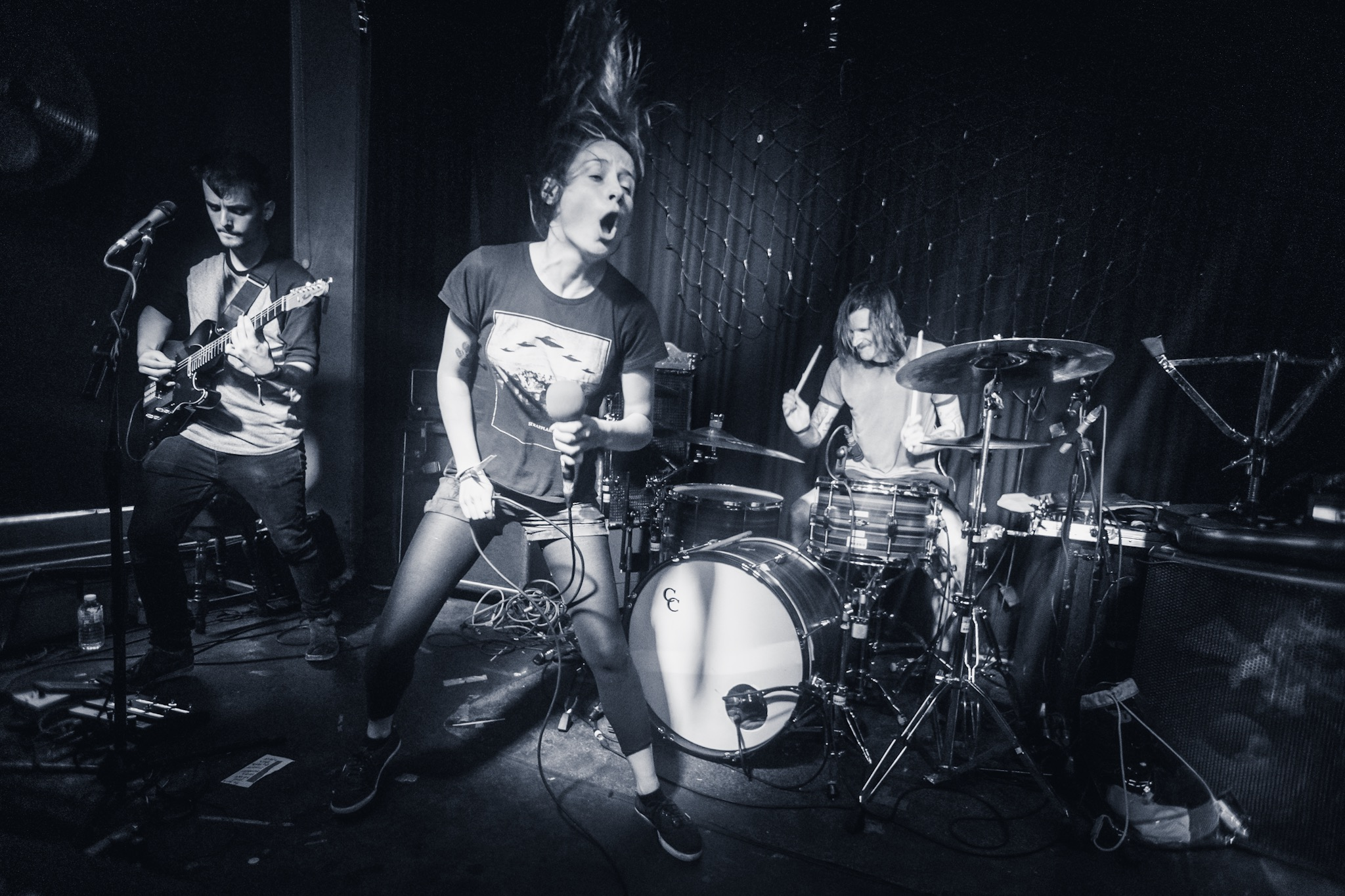
- Petrol Girls at The Great Escape 2019

Background information
- Origin: London, England
- Genres: Hardcore punk; post-hardcore; riot grrrl
- Years active: 2012–present
- Labels: Bomber; Laser Life; Panic State; Hassle
- Members: Ren Aldridge; Joe York; Leo Kuraitė; Michael Dey
- Past members: May Mansour; Robin Gatt; Zock Astpai
- Website: petrolgirls.bandcamp.com

Petrol Girls are an English punk rock band formed in London in 2012 by Ren Aldridge and Leo (Liepa) Kuraitė, with Joe York and Zock Astpai joining later. The band is named after the historical Pétroleuses and is outspokenly feminist. They have released three albums on independent labels.

== History ==
Petrol Girls formed and played their first show in 2012, after just two rehearsals, at a house party hosted by founding member Ren Aldridge (vocals) to celebrate International Women’s Day. Retaining original bassist Leo (Liepa) Kuraitė, who had never played before Aldridge invited her to join, they eventually recruited Joe York (guitar) and Zock Astpai (drums) to complete a sustainable lineup.

Aldridge took the name from a group of 19th century French revolutionaries, les Pétroleuses, after hearing them mentioned by Laurie Penny.

After two EPs, their eponymous self-released 7-inch from 2014 and Some Thing from 2016, the band released their debut album Talk of Violence on Bomber Music in 2017.

In April 2018 the band released single "Survivor" and announced they had signed to Hassle Records for their next release - EP The Future Is Dark released on 14 September.

Their second full length album Cut & Stitch was released on 24 May 2019. It received positive reviews from NPR, The Skinny, and Kerrang! - who in June also called it 'one of the best albums of the year so far'.

In July 2019 it emerged that Aldridge was one of several musicians being sued by singer/rapper Jonny "Itch" Fox, seeking aggravated damages and an injunction for alleged libel.

On 6 November 2019 Kuraitė posted a statement on Facebook stating they were going to leave the band by the end of the year.

On 8 March 2022 (International Women's Day) Petrol Girls released the single Fight For Our Lives featuring Janey Starling. Starling, formerly lead singer of the London band Dream Nails, works for the British feminist organisation Level Up. Ren Aldridge said of the song; "I directly referenced Janey’s Dignity for Dead Women Level Up campaign in the lyrics to this track. Through this campaign, she introduced media guidelines for reporting on femicide and fatal domestic abuse in the UK – this is huge, because media narratives that place blame on the victims of femicide and abuse and treat these murders as isolated incidents are part of the problem".

On 31 March 2022 the band announced their third album, Baby, would be released on 24 June that year. It was recorded with new bassist Robin Gatt, also of Personal Best.

On 27 June 2022 an article penned by Aldridge was published by Kerrang! about the overturning of Roe V Wade in the US, restrictions on abortion in Europe, the requirement for Doctor's approval in the UK, and ways to counter state encroachment on bodily autonomy.

In May 2026, they announced a return to the stage with a line-up reuniting original members of the band, Leo Kuraitė on bass and Michael Dey on drums.

== Discography ==
=== Albums ===
- Talk of Violence - Bomber Music, 12-inch LP, CD, MP3 (2016)
- Cut & Stitch - Hassle Records, 12-inch LP, CD, MP3 (2019)
- Baby - Hassle Records, 12-inch LP, CD, MP3 (2022)

=== EPs ===
- Petrol Girls - Self Released, 7-inch EP, MP3 (2014)
- Some Thing - Laser Life Records (EU) / Panic State Records (USA), 7-inch EP, CD, MP3 (2016)
- The Future Is Dark - Hassle Records, 12-inch EP, MP3 (2018)
