= Lande Hekt =

British indie rock musician

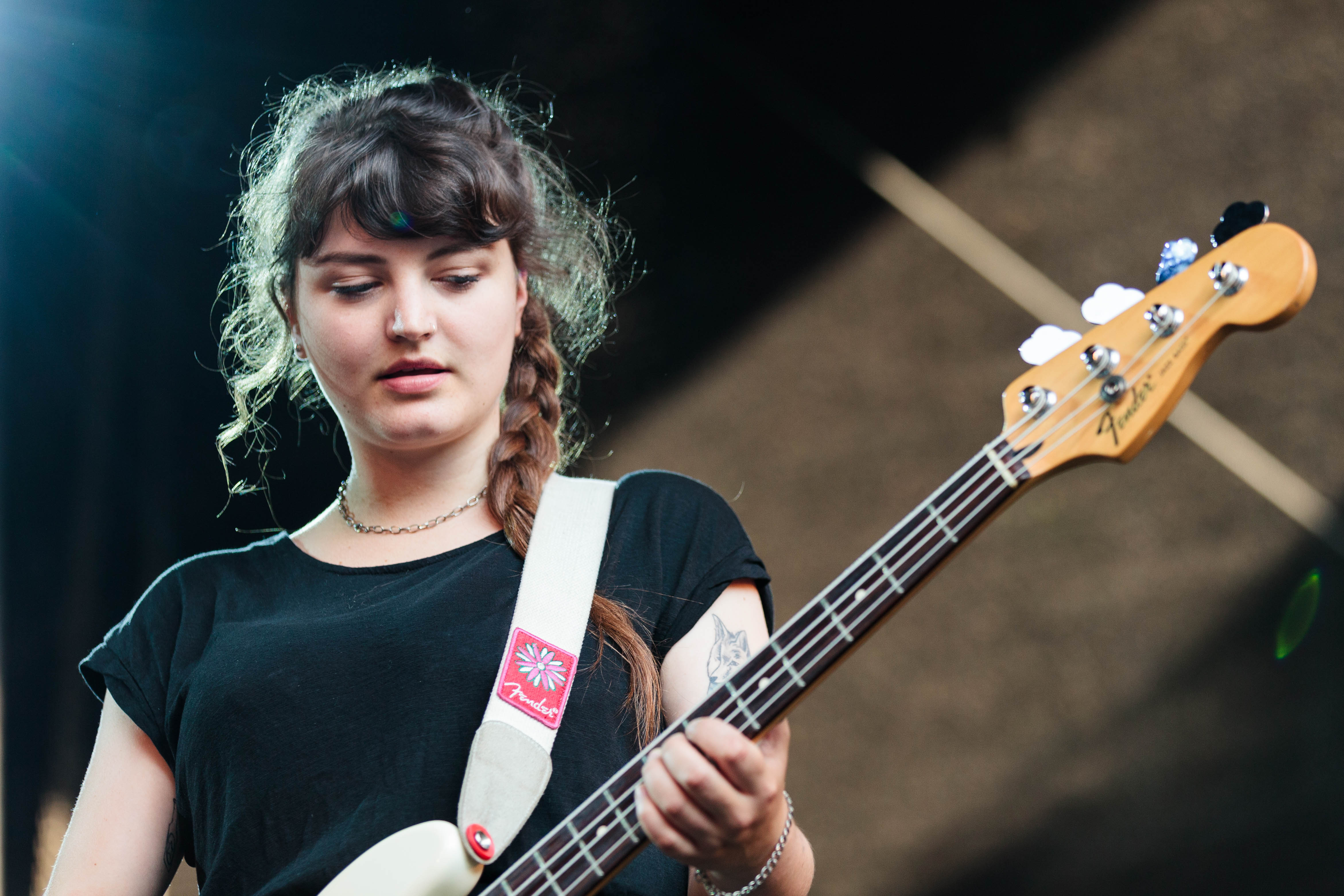
- Lande Hekt performing with Muncie Girls in 2016

Background information
- Born: 1992 or 1993 (age 32–33)
- Origin: Exeter, England
- Genres: Punk rock, Indie rock
- Instruments: Guitar, bass
- Years active: 2010–present
- Labels: Get Better Records; Tapete Records
- Formerly of: Muncie Girls
- Website: https://www.landehekt.co.uk/

Lande Hekt (born 1992 or 1993) is a British indie rock musician. Hekt was previously the lead vocalist of the band Muncie Girls with whom she released two albums. She has released two solo albums on Get Better Records; Going to Hell (2021), and House Without a View (2022). Her third album Lucky Now was released in 2026 on Tapete Records.

== Early life ==
Hekt is from Exeter and of German descent.

== Career ==
Hekt formed Muncie Girls with Dean McMullen in 2010, at age 17, while studying at Exeter College, Devon. The band released two studio albums, and several EPs, before breaking up in 2023.

Having previously self-released a solo EP, Gigantic Disappointment, in 2019, Hekt wrote and recorded her first solo album. The album, titled Going to Hell, was released in January 2021 by Get Better Records and received positive reviews.

In 2022, Hekt released her second full-length solo album titled House Without a View, and released the singles "Backstreet Snow" and "Gay Space Cadets".

On 9 October 2025 Hekt released the single "Favourite Pair Of Shoes" and announced her third solo album, Lucky Now, would be released on 30 January 2026 through Tapete Records.

== Personal life ==
Hekt is a gay woman. She came out shortly before going solo in 2019.

== Discography ==
=== Solo studio albums ===
Title	Album details
Going to Hell	Released: 2021; Label: Get Better Records
House Without a View	Released: 2022; Label: Get Better Records
Lucky Now	Released: 2026; Label: Tapete Records

=== Solo EP ===
Title	Album details
Gigantic Disappointment	Released: 2019; Label: Self-released
Threadbare	Released: 2026; Label: Tapete Records

=== Studio albums with Muncie Girls ===
Title	Album details
From Caplan to Belsize	Released: 2016; Label: Specialist Subject Records (UK) Uncle M Music (EU) Animal Style Records (US)
Fixed Ideals	Released: 2018; Label: Specialist Subject Records (UK) Buzz Records (CAN) Lost Boy (AUS)
