= Flamingo 50 =

English punk band

- Origin: Liverpool, UK
- Genre: Punk
- Years active: 1999–2008; 2013–2014
- Labels: Keith; Ernest Jenning; Drunken Sailor; Fixing A Hole
- Past members: Louise Hanman; Morgan Brown; Will Fitzpatrick; Karen Timms; Laura Pye

Flamingo 50 was an English punk band from Liverpool.

== History ==
Formed in 1999 by Lou Hanman, Morgan Brown, and Karen Timms whilst meeting at university and inspired by the riot grrrl movement. They released two albums, three EPs and four split records, and toured extensively in the UK and France. They were regularly played on the radio by John Peel and Steve Lamacq.

They supported bands such as The Fall, Ghost Mice, Electrelane and The Thermals. They played Ladyfests and queer punk festivals with bands such as The Gossip, Electrelane, Bangs, and Life Without Buildings.

Hanman and Brown were also in another band together during this time called Three Minute Margin.

Flamingo 50 played their last concert in November 2008, before temporarily reforming for two one-off shows in 2013 and 2014.

Hanman would later to move to Bristol where she formed the band Caves and briefly played in Personal Best. She would go on to play with Katie Ellen, Worriers, Mikey Erg and fill in as a touring member of Camp Code and RVIVR. She now lives in Philadelphia, USA with a new project called All Away Lou. Fitzpatrick currently plays in Good Grief and Witching Waves. Brown now plays in Pardon Us.

== Band members ==
- Louise Hanman, vocals and guitar 1999-2008
- Morgan Brown, drums and vocals 1999-2008
- Will Fitzpatrick, bass and vocals 2005-2008
- Karen Timms, bass and vocals 1999–2003
- Laura Pye, bass 2003–2004

== Discography ==
=== Singles/EPs ===
- The Sodastream Selector Volume 1 - split w/Fabiola (Sodastream Politics)
- Go Betsy Go! EP (No Concessions)
- Two Birds One Stone EP (Spank Records)
- split w/J Church (Los Diaper)
- split w/The Measure (SA) (Ernest Jenning Recording Co.)

=== Albums ===
- My Reason (2004), Keith Records
- Tear It Up (2006), Ernest Jenning Recording Co. / Drunken Sailor Records
- What If Will Never Do - singles compilation (2008), Fixing A Hole

=== Other ===
- Split album with Lack Of Reason
- Several tracks were released on the Munkyfest compilation CDs
