= I Feel Weird =

Studio album by Great Cynics
- Released: 18 May 2015
- Genre: Punk rock
- Length: 26:41
- Label: Specialist Subject (UK); Lame-O (USA); Jackknife (AUS)
- Producer: Peter Miles

Great Cynics chronology
Like I Belong (2013)	I Feel Weird (2015)

I Feel Weird is the third studio album by London based punk rock band Great Cynics. It was released through Specialist Subject Records in May 2015.

== Track listing ==
All music is composed by Great Cynics.

No.	Title	Length
1.	"Want You Around (Chunky)"	2:42
2.	"I Went Swimming"
3.	"North Street"
4.	"From The Creators Of Love Actually"
5.	"Complicated"
6.	"Everyone's a Little Bit Weird"
7.	"Lost In You"	2:57
8.	"Kind Of Like"
9.	"Tread Lightly"
10.	"I Know Nothing"
11.	"By The Sea"
Total length:		26:41

Bonus Tracks
No.	Title	Length
12.	"Lost & Found"	2:18
13.	"Wet Feet"	2:15
Total length:		29:14

== Personnel ==
Great Cynics

- Giles Bidder - Vocals/Guitar
- Iona Cairns - Vocals/Bass
- Bob Barrett - Drums
