= Empath (band) =

American punk band

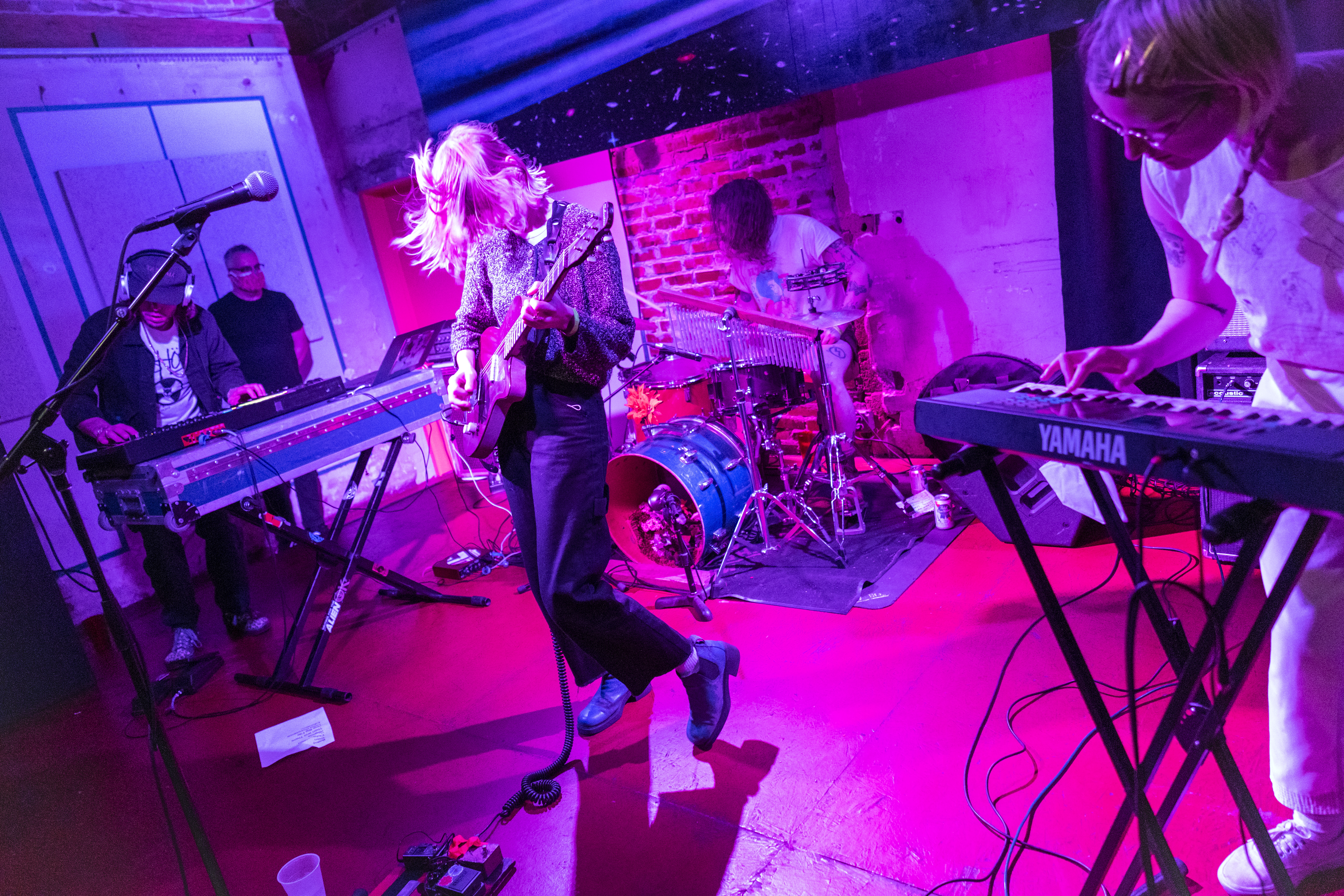
- Empath in Washington DC, 2022

Background information
- Origin: Philadelphia, Pennsylvania, US
- Genres: Noise; punk; psychedelic
- Labels: Fat Possum Records; Get Better Records
- Members: Catherine Elicson; Garrett Koloski; Jem Shanahan; Randall Coon
- Website: empathx.bandcamp.com

Empath is an American noise punk band. They have released two albums and several EPs, and are currently signed to Fat Possum Records.

== History ==
Empath was formed by Catherine Elicson, Jem Shanahan and Garrett Koloski in 2015 whilst the three were roommates in Philadelphia. Elicson had recently moved from Columbus, Ohio, where she had been in the bands Goners and Katherine. Koloski was then the drummer in Syracuse, New York band Perfect Pussy. The trio recorded Crystal Reality Volumes 1 & 2.

They began recording what would become Liberating Guilt and Fear in 2016 with Koloski's former bandmate, Shaun Sutkus. After Coon joined in 2017, he recorded his parts that autumn. It was mastered by Greg Saunier of Deerhoof and eventually released by Get Better Records in 2018. That same year they released a 7" titled Environments, named in tribute to Irv Teibel's 1970s album series of the same name.

In 2018, the band released their debut LP Active Listening: Night on Earth, once again through Get Better Records. The positive reception led to their signing to Fat Possum Records, who immediately reissued the record - along with a vinyl pressing of Liberating Guilt and Fear for the first time.

In late 2021, Empath announced their second album, entitled Visitor, would be released on 11 February 2022.

== Members ==
- Catherine Elicson (guitar and vocals)
- Jem Shanahan (synthesiser)
- Randall Coon (synthesiser)
- Garrett Koloski (drums)

== Discography ==
=== Albums ===
- Active Listening: Night on Earth – Get Better Records, 12" LP, MP3 (2019) / Fat Possum Records, 12" LP, MP3 (2019)
- Visitor – Fat Possum Records, 12" LP, MP3 (2022)

=== Extended plays ===
- Crystal Reality Vol. 1 – Self released, Cassette, MP3 (2016)
- Crystal Reality Vol. 2 – Self released, Cassette, MP3 (2016)
- Liberating Guilt and Fear – Get Better Records, Cassette, MP3 (2018)
- Environments – Get Better Records, 7" single, MP3 (2018)
