= Don't Need Much =

2011 album by Great Cynics

Studio album by Great Cynics
- Released: 14 June 2011
- Genre: Punk rock
- Length: 24:21
- Label: Household Name Records
- Producer: Peter Miles

Great Cynics chronology
Don't Need Much (2011)	In The Valley (2012)

Professional ratings
Review scores
Source	Rating
Absolute Punk	7/10 stars
Alternative Press	3.5/5 stars
Alter the Press	4.5/5 stars
Big Cheese	4/5 stars
Punktastic	4/5 stars
Rock Sound	8/10 stars

Don't Need Much is the debut album from English punk rock band Great Cynics. It was released through Household Name Records in June 2011.

== Track listing ==
All music is composed by Great Cynics

No.	Title	Length
1.	"Home Measures"	1:29
2.	"Nightcaps"	1:48
3.	"Dave & Angela"	2:56
4.	"Stones I've Thrown"	2:36
5.	"Moorhen"	1:59
6.	"25"	3:17
7.	"All The Time Every Time"	2:26
8.	"Cider For Breakfast"	1:42
9.	"Not Saying Sorry"	2:12
10.	"My Quiet Lunch Breaks"	2:56
Total length:		24:21

== Personnel ==
Great Cynics

- Giles Bidder - Vocals/Guitar
- Bob Barrett - Drums

Other Musicians

- Peter Miles - Bass
