= Fixed Ideals =

Studio album by Muncie Girls
- Released: 31 August 2018
- Length: 42:23
- Label: Specialist Subject (UK); Buzz (US)

Muncie Girls chronology
From Caplan To Belsize (2016)	Fixed Ideals (2018)

Professional ratings
Aggregate scores
Source	Rating
Metacritic	80/100
Review scores
Source	Rating
AllMusic	3.5/5 stars
Clash	6/10
DIY	4/5 stars
Exclaim!	9/10

Fixed Ideals is the second and final studio album by British band Muncie Girls. It was released on 31 August 2018 through Specialist Subject Records.

== Critical reception ==
Fixed Ideals was met with "generally favorable" reviews from critics. At Metacritic, which assigns a weighted average rating out of 100 to reviews from mainstream publications, this release received an average score of 80 based on 7 reviews. Aggregator Album of the Year gave the release a 78 out of 100 based on a critical consensus of 14 reviews.

== Accolades ==
Publication	Accolade	Rank	Ref.
The A.V. Club	Best Punk/Hardcore Albums of 2018	N/A	
Drowned in Sound	Top 15 Albums of 2018	10	

== Track listing ==
No.	Title	Length
1.	"Jeremy"	3:46
2.	"Picture of Health"	3:34
3.	"High"	3:47
4.	"Clinic"	3:24
5.	"Falling Down"	3:33
6.	"Isn't Life Funny"	3:02
7.	"Bubble Bath"	3:53
8.	"Fig Tree"	3:19
9.	"Locked Up"	1:44
10.	"In Between Bands"	3:23
11.	"Laugh Again"	2:46
12.	"Hangovers"	2:36
13.	"Family of Four"	3:36
