= In the Valley (EP) =

EP by Great Cynics
- Released: (United Kingdom) 28 February 2012
- Genre: Punk rock
- Length: 7:20
- Label: Kind of Like Records

Great Cynics chronology
| Don't Need Much (2011) | In the Valley (2012) | Like I Belong (2013) |

Professional ratings
Review scores
| Source | Rating |
|---|---|
| Alter the Press | 4/5 stars |

In The Valley is the debut EP from English punk rock band Great Cynics. It was released on Kind of Like Records in February 2012.

== Track listing ==
All music is composed by Great Cynics

| No. | Title | Length |
|---|---|---|
| 1. | "In The Valley" | 1:48 |
| 2. | "14 Coleman St" | 2:24 |
| 3. | "You're Alright" | 3:08 |
| Total length: | | 7:20 |

== Personnel ==
Great Cynics

- Giles Bidder - Vocals/Guitar
- Iona Cairns - Vocals/Bass
- Bob Barrett - Drums
