= Pictoria Vark =

American singer-songwriter

- Pictoria Vark in Chicago in 2026

Background information
- Born: Victoria Park
- Genres: Indie rock
- Years active: 2018–present
- Label: Get Better Records
- Website: victoriaparkbass.com

Victoria Park, known professionally as Pictoria Vark, is an American singer-songwriter.

== Early life and education ==
Vark grew up in the state of New Jersey, where she lived in Bergen County. She is of Korean descent. She took piano lessons at the age of four and played guitar in the fifth grade. When she was the age of nineteen, her family unexpectedly moved to the state of Wyoming. She attended Grinnell College in Iowa, where she earned a degree in French.

== Musical career ==
Vark wrote and performed music beginning in high school, although she did not feel that she was a musician until she was in college. Vark's stage name is a spoonerism of her full name of Victoria Park. She and musician Ella Williams, known by her stage name Squirrel Flower, met while attending Grinnell College and began touring together. She has worked as a touring bassist for Squirrel Flower for several years following and the rock band Pinkshift in 2022. She released her debut extended play, self-titled, in 2018. She later signed with the independent record label Get Better Records. She released her debut album, The Parts I Dread, on April 8, 2022. Her second album, Nothing Sticks, released on March 21, 2025.

== Personal life ==
During the period when she recorded and released The Parts I Dread, Vark lived in Iowa City, Iowa. She later moved to Chicago. She has worked in various non-performing roles within the music industry.

== Discography ==
List of studio albums, with selected details
Title	Album details
The Parts I Dread	Released: April 8, 2022; Label: Get Better Records; Format: Digital download, streaming
Nothing Sticks	Released: March 21, 2025; Label: Get Better Records; Format: Digital download, streaming
