= Like I Belong =

Studio album by Great Cynics
- Released: 1 April 2013
- Genre: Punk rock
- Length: 34:50
- Label: Bomber Music
- Producer: Peter Miles

Great Cynics chronology
In the Valley (2012)	Like I Belong (2013)	I Feel Weird (2015)

Professional ratings
Review scores
Source	Rating
Bring the Noise	9/10 stars
Punknews.org	3.5/5 stars
Punktastic	4/5 stars

Like I Belong is the second album from English punk rock band Great Cynics. It was released through Bomber Music in April 2013.

== Track listing ==
All music is composed by Great Cynics

No.	Title	Length
1.	"Queen of the Anarchists"	2:37
2.	"Letting Go"	2:31
3.	"In My Head"	2:32
4.	"Ways Down"	3:03
5.	"Kingsland Roaches"	2:35
6.	"Goodbye Astbury Castle"	1:41
7.	"Younger than Everyone"	2:53
8.	"Back to Hackney"	2:22
9.	"Waster"	2:55
10.	"Feeling in My Throat"	2:17
11.	"Song for Sophie"	2:45
12.	"Find the Humour"	2:43
13.	"One Like You"	4:01
Total length:		34:50

== Personnel ==
Great Cynics

- Giles Bidder - Vocals/Guitar
- Iona Cairns - Vocals/Bass
- Bob Barrett - Drums
