= Flung (musician) =

American indie rock musician

- Born: Kashika Kollaikal
- Origin: Oakland, California, United States
- Occupation: indie rock musician
- Labels: Topshelf; Citrus City; Get Better
- Member of: Honey Oat

Kashika Kollaikal, better known by her stage name Flung, is an American indie rock musician based in Oakland, California.

== History ==
Kollaikal is a member of the jazz band Honey Oat. Kollaikal released her first album under the Flung moniker in 2020, titled Shaky But My Hair Is Grown. The album was released through the labels Topshelf Records and Citrus City Records. In 2022, Kollaikal released her second album as Flung, titled Apricot Angel. In 2024, Kollaikal released her third and latest album as Flung titled All Heartbeat. Prior to the albums release, Stereogum named it one of "The 200 Most Anticipated Albums of 2024". The album was released through Get Better Records.
