= I Freak Out =

2016 EP by The Hard Aches

EP by The Hard Aches
- Released: 9 September 2016
- Recorded: February 2016
- Studio: Birdland Studios, Melbourne
- Genre: Alternative rock, punk rock
- Length: 18:31
- Label: Anchorhead Records; ADA
- Producer: Lindsay Gravina

The Hard Aches EP chronology
Organs & Airports (2013)	I Freak Out (2016)

Singles from I Freak Out
- 1. "Glad That You're Gone" Released: 8 May 2016; 2. "Gut Full" Released: 9 September 2016

I Freak Out is the second extended play by Australian melodic punk/alternative rock band The Hard Aches, released on 9 September 2016 by Anchorhead Records.

== Background and promotion ==
In February 2016, the band went to Birdland Studios in Melbourne to record their second EP, working with producer Lindsay Gravina (who'd previously worked on albums for The Living End and Magic Dirt) to create the bands first record not managed entirely by David and Upton themselves.

In May 2016, The Hard Aches released the single "Glad That You’re Gone", which was added to Triple J's full rotation. The song, along with its accompanying music video, were well received by critics and fans. In August 2016, the band announced the upcoming release of their second EP.

The Hard Aches released their second extended play, I Freak Out, in September 2016. The six-track EP spawned a second single, "Gut Full", which also received a music video on 16 September 2016.

== Critical reception ==
Professional ratings
Review scores
Source	Rating
The Brag	4/5 stars
Metratone	3.6/5 stars

The extended play received positive reviews, and marked the band's first-ever appearance on the ARIA Album Charts. The Brag praised the EP, saying "I Freak Out cements The Hard Aches as a band to watch, cramming emotionally and musically dense content into every second, leaving the release bursting at the seams". Metratone gave the album a positive review, stating: "amongst all the catchy guitar riffs and belt worthy lyrics, the only complaint I have is that I don’t want it to end".

== Track listing ==
Track listing adapted from BandCamp.

No.	Title	Length
1.	"I Freak Out"	2:28
2.	"Breakdown"	2:55
3.	"Gut Full"	2:53
4.	"Glad That You're Gone"	3:18
5.	"Incoherent"	3:03
6.	"Alcohol and Cigarettes"	3:54
Total length:		18:31

== Personnel ==
The Hard Aches

- Ben David – lead vocals, guitar
- Alex Upton – drums

Production

- Lindsay Gravina – producer, mixing and mastering
- Brenton Conlan – audio engineer

Design

- Elliot Oakes – photography
- Chris Cowburn – artwork

== Charts ==
Chart (2016)	Peak position
Australian Albums (ARIA)	48

== Release history ==
Region	Date	Label	Format	Catalog
Australia	9 September 2016	Anchorhead Records	CD, digital download, streaming	ANC022C
Australia	9 September 2016	Anchorhead Records	LP	ANC022V
