= Suzie True =

American indie rock band

Suzie True is an American indie rock band from Los Angeles, California.

== History ==
Suzie True began in 2020, when they announced their debut album, Saddest Girl At The Party, on Buzz Records. Not long after the announcement, the group released a single titled "Bailey" from the album., as well as the single "Carmen". The album was released on November 27, 2020, through Get Better Records.

The group announced their second full-length album in 2023 titled Sentimental Scum. In May 2023, the band released the title track from the album. The album was released on June 30, 2023.

Their third full-length album How I Learned To Love What's Gone was released in 2025.
