= Grow Into It =

Grow into It

Studio album by Doe
- Released: September 28, 2018
- Genre: Rock, Indie rock
- Length: 39:06
- Label: Big Scary Monsters, Topshelf Records

Doe chronology
Some Things Last Longer than You (2016)	Grow into It (2018)

Singles from Grow into It
- 1. "Heated" Released: July 26, 2018; 2. "Labour like I Do" Released: August 29, 2018; 3. "Team Spirit" Released: February 14, 2019

Grow into It is the second studio album from British indie rock band Doe. It was released on September 28, 2018, through Big Scary Monsters and Topshelf Records.

== Track list ==
No.	Title	Length
1.	"My Friends"	3:46
2.	"Labour like I Do"	3:40
3.	"One at a Time"	3:26
4.	"Team Spirit"	4:14
5.	"But It All Looks the Same"	4:08
6.	"Heated"	4:03
7.	"Motivates Me"	3:09
8.	"Even Fiction"	2:57
9.	"Cathy"	4:28
10.	"Here in the Dirt"	5:06

== Personnel ==
- Nicola Leel - guitars, vocals, keyboards
- Jake Popyura - drums, vocals, percussion
- Dean Smithers - guitars, keyboards
- Matthew Johnson - producer, engineer, mixing
- Carl Saff - mastering
- Lewes Herriot - cover photography
- Bri Weadock - sleeve artwork
