= Pheromones (The Hard Aches album) =

2015 album by the Hard Aches

Studio album by The Hard Aches
- Released: 22 May 2015
- Studio: Hillside Recording, Adelaide, SA; ADD Recording, Cudlee Creek, SA
- Genre: Alternative rock, punk rock
- Length: 37:20
- Label: Anchorhead Records
- Producer: The Hard Aches; Matt Hills

The Hard Aches chronology
Pheromones (2015)	Mess (2018)

Singles from Pheromones
- 1. "I Get Like This" Released: 16 April 2015; 2. "Knots" Released: 22 May 2015

Pheromones is the debut studio album by Australian melodic punk/alternative rock band The Hard Aches, released on 22 May 2015 by Anchorhead Records.

== Background and promotion ==
THe Hard Aches began working on their debut album in 2013. In a 2016 interview with The Brag, drummer Alex Upton explained: "A lot of the songs that ended up on Pheromones were written around the time that we put out our last EP (Organs & Airports) back in 2013. By the time that we’d recorded them, they were at least 18-months old and had been a part of the setlist for ages."

In April 2015, The Hard Aches released the single "I Get Like This", and announced the upcoming release of their debut album. The song, along with its accompanying music video, were well received by critics and fans.

The Hard Aches released their debut album, Pheromones, in May 2015. The twelve-track album spawned a second single, "Knots", which also received a music video in July 2015.

== Critical reception ==
The album received positive reviews. Happy Mag praised the album, saying "Pheromones is the ideal debut album, showing maturity and talent far beyond The Hard Aches’ experience as a relatively new band". Woroni gave the album a positive review, describing it as: "a great album for those thinking about jumping on the folk-punk bandwagon".

== Track listing ==
Track listing adapted from BandCamp.

No.	Title	Length
1.	"This Year"	2:03
2.	"I Get Like This"	3:17
3.	"Old Man Hands"	3:58
4.	"Pheromones"	3:10
5.	"Braver Than I Am"	2:32
6.	"Old Souls"	3:57
7.	"Knots"	2:31
8.	"You're An Alarm Clock"	3:21
9.	"St. Helens"	2:59
10.	"(We All Die)"	1:37
11.	"We All Do"	3:03
12.	"Just Like Your Mother"	3:54
Total length:		37:20

== Personnel ==
The Hard Aches

- Ben David – lead vocals, guitar, bass guitar
- Alex Upton – drums

Additional musicians

- Brianna Mahoney – additional vocals
- Steve Rosewarne – additional vocals

Production

- Matt Hills – mixing and mastering

Design

- Chris Cowburn – cover design
- Bec Stevens – photography
- Sianne van Abkoude – insert design

== Release history ==
Region	Date	Label	Format	Catalog
Australia	22 May 2015	Anchorhead Records	CD, LP, digital download, streaming	ANC016
