= Muncie Girls =

UK musical group

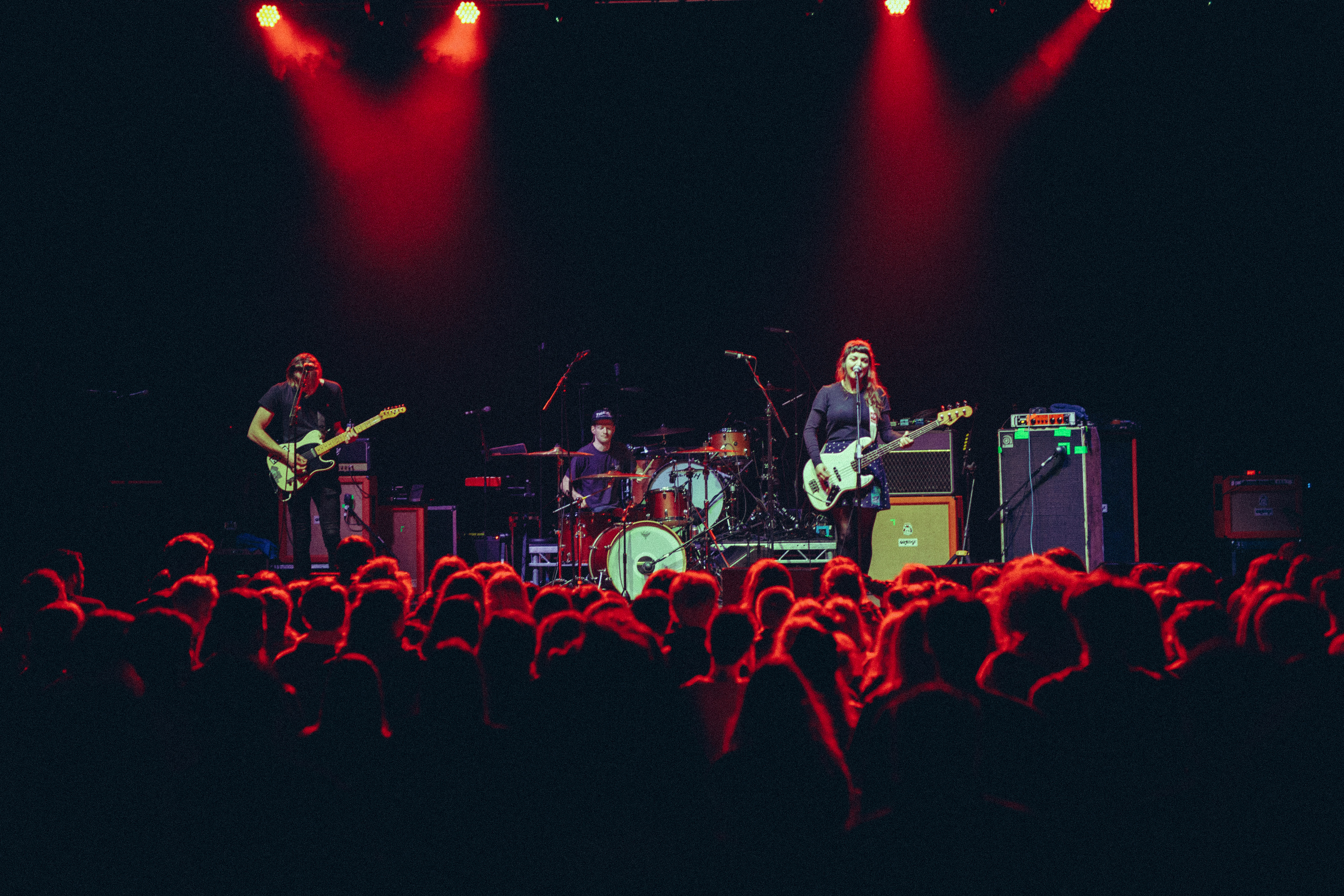
- Muncie Girls - Norwich February 2017

Background information
- Origin: Exeter, England
- Genres: Punk rock, indie rock
- Years active: 2010–2023
- Label: Specialist Subject Records
- Members: Lande Hekt; Dean McMullen; Luke Ellis
- Past members: Sam De Wolf

Muncie Girls were a British punk rock band, formed in Exeter, South West England in 2010. Its longest serving lineup consisted of Lande Hekt (bass, rhythm guitar, vocals), Dean McMullen (lead guitar), and Luke Ellis (drums). The band released two studio albums, From Caplan to Belsize (2016) and Fixed Ideals (2018), on hometown label Specialist Subject Records and toured internationally.

== History ==
Lande Hekt and Dean McMullen formed Muncie Girls in 2010 while attending Exeter College. They played their first gigs at the Cavern Club, their local rock venue, and became very involved in the underground DIY Punk scene. They were joined originally by drummer Sam De Wolf. The band put on their own shows, as well as fundraising events, and Hekt started a music workshop for women under the name 'School of Frock'. Ellis joined in 2012, solidifying the lineup.

After releasing two EPs on hometown label Specialist Subject Records in 2012 and 2013, with De Wolf leaving and Luke Ellis taking over on the drums after the first, the label released their debut album From Caplan To Belsize on 4 March 2016, recorded at The Ranch in Southampton. The title of the album is a reference to The Bell Jar by Sylvia Plath. It references the two asylums the book's protagonist is kept in, and is used to represent the idea of the album being a journey.

The album was received well including 5/5 reviews in Kerrang!, Upset and 9/10 in Rock Sound. The band was also nominated for 'Best British Newcomer' at the Kerrang! Awards 2016. Following the album, the band toured internationally including support slots with Taking Back Sunday, Frank Iero and the Cellabration, Los Campesinos!, The Wonder Years, and Such Gold. They also played Glastonbury Festival that year, appearing with Billy Bragg on the Left Field Stage, as well as Reading and Leeds Festivals, Groezrock and SXSW.

On 13 June 2018, the band announced their second LP Fixed Ideals (another Plath reference, this time a line from the poem "To Eva") with a video for lead single "Picture of Health". Hekt described the new collection as some of the most personal songs she'd written, with a diverse range of influences, such as The Replacements, Siouxsie and the Banshees, The Popguns and The Pastels. The album was released on 31 August 2018.

On 15 November 2019 Hekt self-released her first solo record, Gigantic Disappointment, to positive reviews. A full-length follow up, Going to Hell, was released 22 January 2021 on Get Better Records On 14 January 2022 McMullen released his first solo single, "Clouds Hold Up The Sun", on Fierce Panda Records. A debut EP, Part One, followed that September.

In August 2023, the band announced that they would be breaking up following a final run of UK shows in December 2023.

== Discography ==
=== Albums ===
- From Caplan To Belsize - Specialist Subject Records (UK) / Uncle M Music (EU) / Animal Style Records (US) 12" LP, CD, MP3 (2016)
- Fixed Ideals - Specialist Subject Records (UK) / Buzz Records (Canada) / Lost Boy (AUS) 12" LP, CD, MP3 (2018)

=== EPS ===
- Muncie Girls - What We Should Be Doing, EP, Cassette (2011)
- Muncie Girls - SP Records, EP, CDr (2012)
- Revolution Summer - Specialist Subject Records, 12" EP, CD, MP3 (2012)
- Sleepless - Specialist Subject Records, 12" EP, CD, MP3 (2013)
- B-Sides the Point- Specialist Subject Records, 12" EP, MP3 (2020)

=== Split Releases ===
- Split with Great Cynics - Specialist Subject Records, 12" EP, MP3 (2014)
- Split with Sandlotkids - Uncle M Music, 7", MP3 (2013)
- Split with The Hard Aches - Anchorhead Records, 7" (2017) - "Respect" from From Caplan to Belsize released as B-side single.

=== Singles ===
- "Picture of Health" - Specialist Subject Records, 7", MP3 (2018)
