= Doe (band) =

British indie rock band

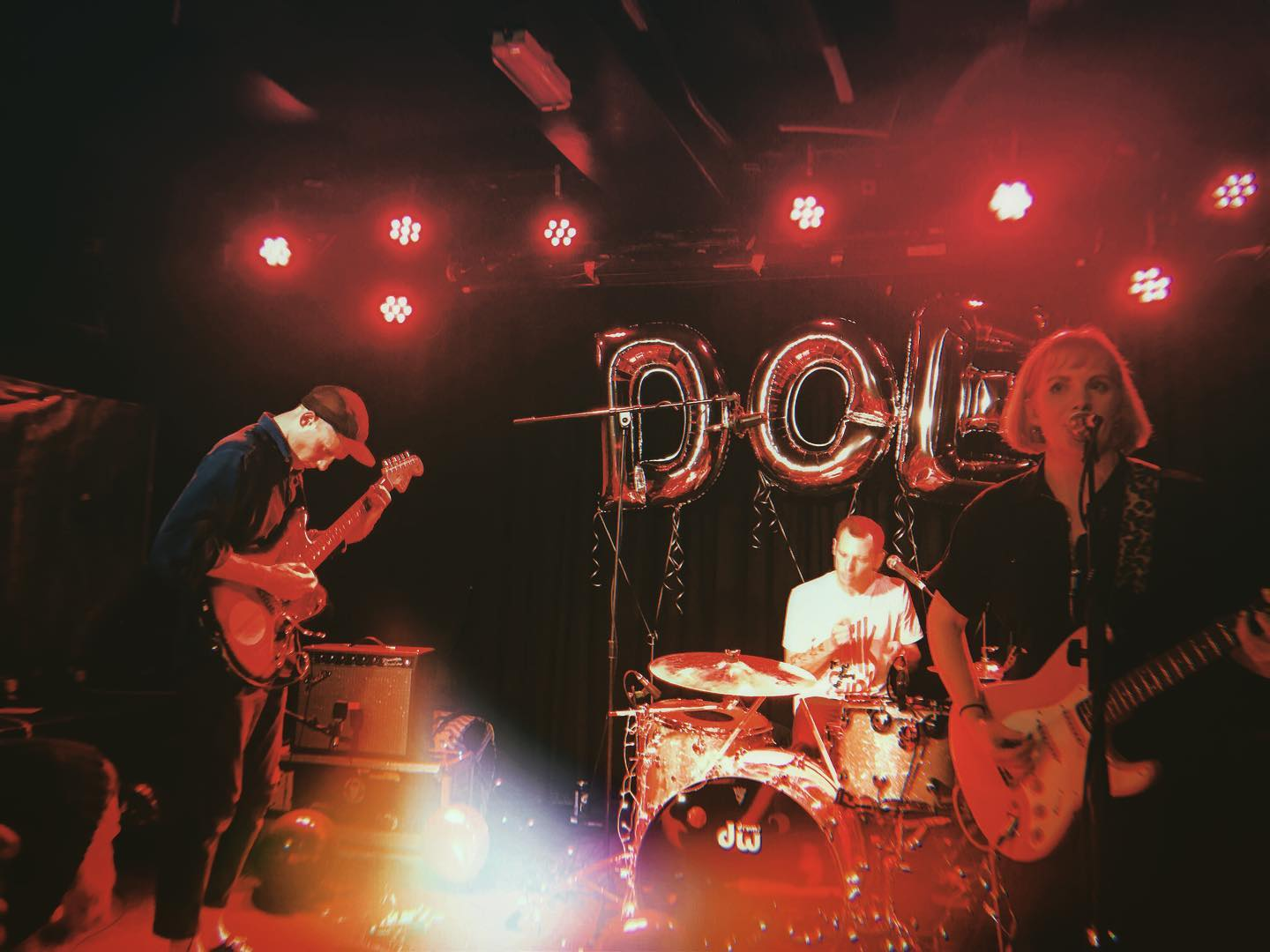
- Doe at their final concert, The Lexington, Islington, 2019

Background information
- Origin: London, England
- Genres: Indie rock; punk rock
- Years active: 2013–2019
- Labels: Big Scary Monsters; Topshelf; Specialist Subject; Old Flame Records
- Past members: Nicola Leel; Jake Popyura; Dean Smithers; Alessandro Sorenti; Matthew Sykes
- Website: doetheband.co.uk

Doe (/dəʊ/, previously stylised as DOE) were a British indie rock band from London, England, consisting of Nicola Leel (guitar, vocals), Jake Popyura (drums, vocals) and Dean Smithers (guitar). The band released two studio albums and toured extensively in the UK, Europe and USA.

== History ==
Doe started in early 2013 after Nicola Leel and Jake Popyura, who had met through a classified ad the previous year, cemented the initial lineup with the addition of guitarist Alessandro 'Alex' Sorenti. Their formation was quickly followed by a string of UK shows, three EP releases (S/t, Summer 2013 and Late Bloomer) and a European tour with their friends The Exhausts. Matthew Sykes joined on guitar after Sorenti's departure and the band released Sooner, an EP coupled with a lyric/photo zine.

The compilation LP First Four was released through Specialist Subject Records in 2014, with a US cassette version following a year later via Old Flame Records. 2015 saw the release of single Avalanche/Basement on Fierce Panda and a split LP on Alcopop! Records. Sykes parted ways with the band in September that year and was replaced by Dean Smithers prior to a UK tour with Dogs On Acid.

In March 2016, Doe recorded their debut full-length effort Some Things Last Longer than You with producer Matthew Johnson (Hookworms) and in July released videos for the singles Sincere and Last Ditch. The album was released on 9 September 2016 to critical acclaim.

The band spent much of 2017 touring in support of the album, including UK/EU stints with LVL UP, Jeff Rosenstock, Pile and Honeyblood. They also embarked on their first North American tour with Philadelphia-based Yankee Bluff.

Doe's second album, Grow into It, was released on 28 September 2018 through Big Scary Monsters and Topshelf Records. The band immediately embarked on tours of the UK and Europe, including dates with Speedy Ortiz and Dilly Dally. Grow into It was featured on ABC News' '50 Best Albums of 2018' list, ranking at number 11.

In June 2019, following tours of Europe, USA and several UK festival appearances, Doe announced they would be splitting up. In a statement posted to their social media channels, they called their decision "100% mutual/amicable/positive", stating that whilst it was an experience they "wouldn’t have swapped out for anything", it could often be "stressful and anxiety-inducing to boot". The band played their farewell show at The Lexington on 7 September 2019, with a video and live album of the show made available digitally in March 2021.

== Members ==
- Nicola Leel – guitar, vocals (2013–2019)
- Jake Popyura – drums, vocals (2013–2019)
- Dean Smithers – guitar (2015–2019)
- Alessandro Sorenti – guitar (2013–2014, 2015)
- Matthew Sykes – guitar (2014–2015)

== Discography ==
=== Albums ===
- Some Things Last Longer than You, LP/CD/cassette (2016) Specialist Subject Records/Old Flame Records
- Grow into It, LP/CD/cassette (2018) Big Scary Monsters/Topshelf Records

=== Compilation albums ===
- First Four, LP (2014) Specialist Subject Records, cassette (2015) Old Flame Records

=== Live albums ===
- Sincerely, Doe: Live at The Lexington, digital (2021) self-released

=== EPs and singles ===
- S/t, CD (2013) Regicide Records
- Summer 2013, cassette (2013) Keroleen Records
- Late Bloomer, CD-R (2013) self-released
- Sooner, cassette and zine (2014) Keroleen Records
- Avalanche/Basement, digital (2015) Fierce Panda
- Susanne, 7" (2015) Art Is Hard Records
- Sincere, digital (2016) Specialist Subject Records/Old Flame Records
- Last Ditch, digital (2016) Specialist Subject Records/Old Flame Records
- Heated, digital (2018) Big Scary Monsters/Topshelf Records
- Labour like I Do, digital (2018) Big Scary Monsters/Topshelf Records
- Team Spirit/Just What I Needed, Mini CD (2019) Keroleen Records/Big Scary Monsters

=== Split releases ===
- Doe/Taxa, 7" (2014) Clue #2 Records
- Johnny Foreigner/Playlounge/Doe/Doctrines, LP (2015) Alcopop! Records/Dog Knights Productions
