= Caves (band) =

English melodic punk band (2009–2018)

- Origin: Bristol, England
- Genre: Punk rock
- Years active: 2009–2018
- Labels: Specialist Subject; Yo-Yo Dead Broke
- Spinoff of: Flamingo 50
- Past members: Lou Hanman; Jonathan Minto; Dave Brent; Michael Young

Caves were an English melodic punk band from Bristol. Their lineup was based around the core duo of Lou Hanman (vocals/guitarist) and Jonathan Minto (bass/vocals). They have released albums on Specialist Subject Records, Yo-Yo Records, and Dead Broke Records.

== History ==
Caves was formed by Lou Hanman (previously of Flamingo 50) after moving from Liverpool to Bristol, where Hanman met original drummer Dave Brent. After an initial lineup with Dave Brent's house mate Michael on bass, Jonathan Minto joined in 2010.

They played Florida Punk festival The Fest for the first time in 2010 (the first of three years in a row). The same year they released their debut self-titled EP, and a four-way split 10-inch with Calvinball, Pure Graft, and Big City Plan. They recorded their debut album, Homeward Bound, in the beginning of 2011 and it was released in July of that year.

In 2012 Caves toured with Pennsylvanian band Spraynard and Sundials.

In 2013 their second album, Betterment, was released to acclaim that July.

In 2014 they released third album Leaving, just eight songs and a total runtime of less than 20 minutes. That year Hanman moved to Philadelphia. The band continued to write long distance, and in 2017 they released a fourth album, Always Why.

In late August and early September 2018, they supported Australian band Camp Cope on a partial UK and European tour.

Hanman has also played in Philadelphia based bands Worriers and Katie Ellen, as well as being an occasional touring bassist for Olympia, Washington band RVIVR. Minto plays in Bristol based bands Dogeyed and Hell Maybe.

== Discography ==
=== Albums ===
- Homeward Bound - Yo-Yo Records (EU) / Specialist Subject Records (UK), 12-inch LP, MP3, (2011)
- Betterment - Yo-Yo Records (EU) / Specialist Subject Records (UK), 12-inch LP, MP3, (2013)
- Leaving - Yo-Yo Records (EU) / Specialist Subject Records (UK), 12-inch LP, MP3, (2014)
- Always Why - Yo-Yo Records (EU) / Specialist Subject Records (UK) / Dead Broke Records (USA), 12-inch LP, MP3, (2017)

=== EPs ===
- Caves - Specialist Subject Records, 7-inch, MP3, (2010)

=== Split releases ===
- Split With Calvinball, Pure Graft, and Big City Plan - Roidh, 10-inch EP, MP3, (2010)
- Split With Sundials - Kiss of Death Records, 7-inch EP, MP3, (2011)
