= Great Cynics =

English punk rock band

- Origin: London, England
- Genres: Punk rock, indie rock
- Years active: 2009–2017
- Labels: Specialist Subject, Bomber Music, Household Name, Lame-O
- Members: Giles Bidder Bob Barrett

Great Cynics were a punk rock group based in London, England.

== History ==
=== Formation and debut album ===
Great Cynics initially started out as a solo project for Brighton based singer-songwriter Giles Bidder under the name Cynics. After relocating to London in 2010 and supporting Against Me! and Paint It Black across several UK dates, Bidder decided that his songs would work better with a full band behind him and teamed up with drummer Bob Barrett. Bidder and Barrett then headed into the studio to record what would become Don't Need Much with producer Peter Miles handling bass duties. Iona Cairns joined the band just before their first tour. Shortly before the album's release, the band were forced to rename themselves after American garage rock revival band The Cynics threatened legal action, and they subsequently became Great Cynics. In June 2011, Great Cynics debut album Don't Need Much was released to positive acclaim.

Following the success of Don't Need Much, the band released the In the Valley EP in late February 2012.

=== Like I Belong and I Feel Weird ===
Great Cynics released their second full-length album Like I Belong in April 2013. After the release of Like I Belong Great Cynics embarked on several national and international tours alongside the likes of Broadway Calls, We Are The Ocean, Joyce Manor, Cheap Girls, Apologies, I Have None, The Smith Street Band and Gnarwolves. Over the 2013 August Bank Holiday weekend, Great Cynics opened the Lock Up Stage at the Reading and Leeds Festivals.

In late 2014, the band announced plans for their third album that would be released in 2015. In February 2015, it was announced that the album, titled I Feel Weird, would be released through Specialist Subject Records in April 2015, with Lost in You being the lead single.

== Band members ==
- Giles Bidder – Vocals/Guitar
- Bob Barrett – Drums
- Ollie "Jugs" Ward – Bass (live only)

=== Former members ===
- Iona Cairns – Vocals/Bass

== Discography ==
=== Studio albums ===
- "Don't Need Much" – Household Name Records (2011)
- "Like I Belong" – Bomber Music (2013)
- "I Feel Weird" – Specialist Subject Records (2015)
- "POSI" – Specialist Subject Records (2017)

=== EPs ===
- "In The Valley" – Kind of Like Records (2012)

=== Splits ===
- Muncie Girls/Great Cynics (Split with Muncie Girls) – Specialist Subject Records (2014)

=== Music Videos ===
- Cider For Breakfast (2011)
- 14 Coleman St. (2012)
- Back to Hackney (2013)
- Letting Go (2013)
- Whatever You Want (2014)
- Lost in You (2015)
