= Cheerbleederz =

British Indie rock trio

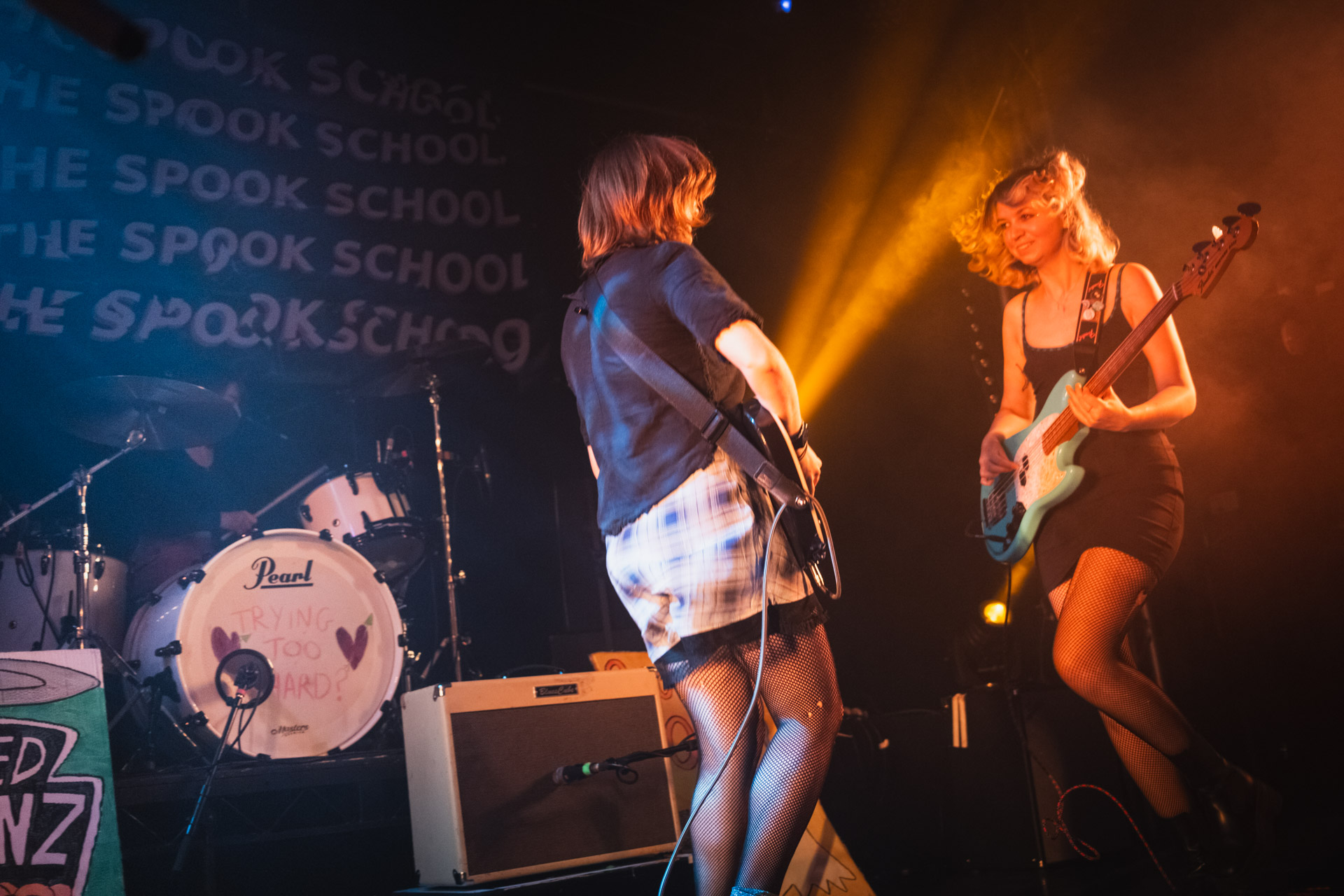
- in 2023 at The Dome in London

Background information
- Origin: London, England
- Genres: Indie rock; Indie pop; Pop punk
- Years active: 2018–present
- Label: Alcopop! Records
- Members: Kathryn Woods; Sophie MacKenzie; Phoebe Cross
- Website: cheerbleederz.bandcamp.com

Cheerbleederz are a British indie rock power trio supergroup formed in London. The band consists of Kathryn Woods (guitar), Sophie MacKenzie (bass) and Phoebe Cross (drums). They all contribute vocals. They have released three EPs and one full-length album, all released by Alcopop! Records. They are sometimes referred to as a DIY supergroup due to their members having been in other bands such as Fresh, Happy Accidents, Me Rex, Finish Flag and Supermilk.

== History ==
Cheerbleederz released their debut EP, Faceplant, via Alcopop! Records in December 2018.

In June 2020 they released a followup, Lobotany, which Godisinthetv zine called "a very fine record indeed".

In July 2022 they released their debut album, Even In Jest.

They have played festivals and concerts internationally including Switzerland's Inhumano Fest in 2019, Wales Goes Pop! festival in 2021, 2000 Trees festival in 2022 and Madrid Pop Fest 2023.

In April 2023 Cheerbleederz toured England and Scotland with Fresh in support of their latest albums.

On 5 September 2025 the released another EP, titled Prove Me Wrong.

== Discography ==
=== Albums ===
- Even In Jest - Alcopop! Records, LP, Digital (2022)

=== EPs ===
- Faceplant - Alcopop! Records, Cassette, Digital (2018)
- Lobotany - Alcopop! Records, Digital (2020)
- Prove Me Wrong - Alcopop! Records, Digital (2025)
