= Pardon Us (band) =

English punk band

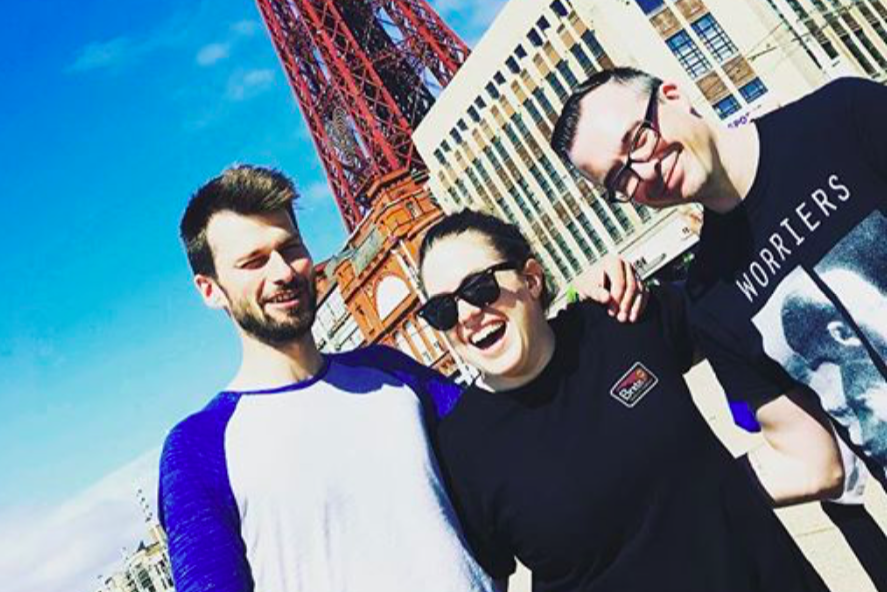
- Pardon Us in 2018

Background information
- Origin: Liverpool, England
- Genres: Punk
- Years active: 2014 - present
- Labels: Everything Sucks Music; Johann's Face; Fixing A Hole; Keith
- Spinoff of: Flamingo 50: Down and Outs; The No Marks; Town Bike
- Members: Morgan Brown; Gabby Santos; Alex Howard

Pardon Us are a three-piece DIY punk band from Liverpool.

== History ==
Pardon Us formed in 2014. Following a split EP with Only Strangers on Keith Records, and a self-titled EP, their debut album Wait was released in July 2019. Their second album Seamless was released in August 2020.

The band's members have previously played in Liverpool-based acts Flamingo 50, Down and Outs, The No Marks and Town Bike, and have cited Hüsker Dü, Snuff, Naked Raygun and J Church as major influences.

== Musical style ==
Their music is characterised by fast-paced live performances and gang vocals.

== Members ==
- Morgan Brown - guitar, vocals
- Gabby Santos - drums, vocals
- Alex Howard - bass, vocals

== Discography ==
=== Albums ===
- 'Wait' - Everything Sucks Music (UK), Johann's Face Records (US), Fixing a Hole (Japan) LP/CD/Mp3 (2019)
- 'Seamless' - Everything Sucks Music (UK), Fixing a Hole (Japan) LP/CD/Mp3 (2020)

=== EPs ===
- "Pardon Us" - Everything Sucks Music, 7"/Mp3 (2017)

=== Splits ===
- "Pardon Us // Only Strangers split" - Keith Records, CD (2015)
