= Fresh (band) =

British pop punk band

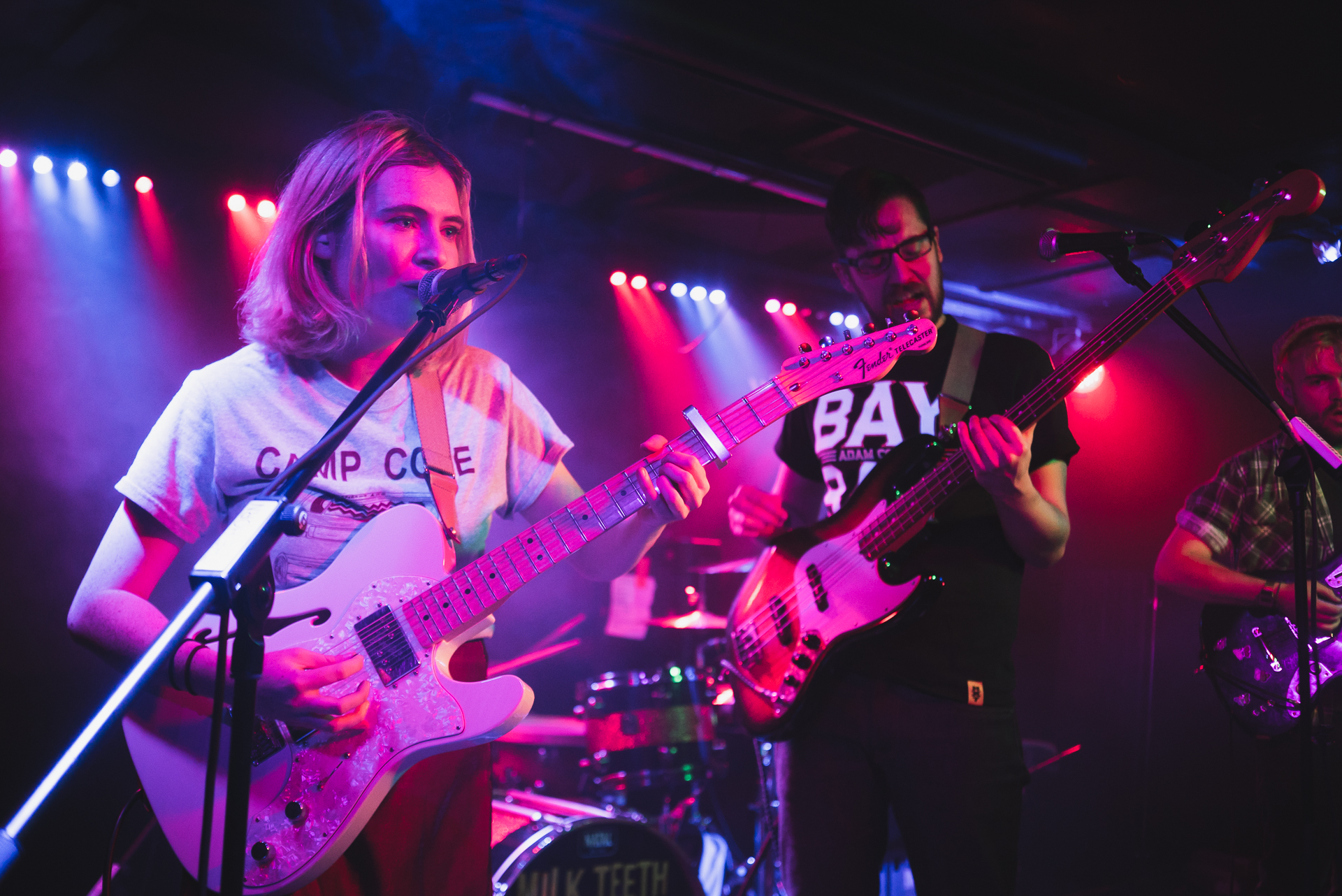
- Fresh in 2018

Background information
- Origin: London, England
- Genres: Pop punk; Indie rock; Indie pop
- Years active: 2015–present
- Labels: Specialist Subject Records; Get Better Records
- Members: Kathryn Woods; George Phillips; Daniel Goldberg; Joely Smith
- Past members: Myles McCabe (2017–2023); James Rowland (2015–2017); Deyaz Willis-Browne (2015–2016); Soroush Fereydoni (2015–2016)
- Website: freshpunks.bandcamp.com

Fresh is a British pop punk band formed in London in 2015 by Kathryn Woods (vocals/guitar), with George Phillips (bass) and Daniel Goldberg (drums) joining in 2016. The current lineup is completed by Joely Smith (guitar), who joined in 2023. They have released three albums and four EPs.

== History ==
Fresh was started in London in 2015 by songwriter Kathryn Woods (vocals/guitar). George Phillips (bass) and Daniel Goldberg (drums) joined the live band in 2016, and would go on to play on its debut album. Myles McCabe was the band's guitarist between 2017 and 2023. The current lineup is completed by Joely Smith (guitar) who officially joined in November 2023.

After self-releasing two EPs in 2015, the band signed to Specialist Subject Records and released their self-titled debut album on 18 August 2017. The album was recorded at The Ranch in Southampton.

In July 2017, they were featured in Kerrang! which compared them to Modern Baseball, Joyce Manor, and Diet Cig. The article quotes Kathryn as saying, "Fresh started because I was a teenage girl who was bored of only seeing men playing in bands".

In December 2017, ABC News listed their debut album as one of their 50 best albums of that year.

Since 2018's "Daytime" / "Nighttime" AA single everything has been recorded with Rich Mandell of the band Happy Accidents. Mandell also plays in the band Me Rex led by McCabe and of which Woods was also a member.

Since 2018 Woods has also played in the band Cheerbleederz.

In February 2019, Fresh announced their second album Withdraw would be released on 7 June, unveiling the lead single "Willa" (named after Willa Cather).

On 9 March 2021, the band released the single "Girl Clout". Then on 19 April they announced it was from a new EP that was to be released on 30 April, entitled The Summer I Got Good At Guitar, as well as unveiling a second single - "My Redemption Arc".

On 1 July 2022 Fresh released their third album, Raise Hell, on Specialist Subject in the UK and Get Better Records in the US.

On 19 April 2024 the band released the EP Merch Girl, featuring two original songs and a cover of "Long Long Time" by Linda Ronstadt.

Fresh toured the UK with Cheekface and Martha in July 2025.

== Discography ==
=== Albums ===
- Fresh - Specialist Subject Records, 12" LP, CD, Cassette, MP3 (2017)
- Withdraw - Specialist Subject Records, 12" LP, CD, MP3 (2019)
- Raise Hell - Specialist Subject Records (UK) / Get Better Records (USA), 12" LP, CD, Cassette, MP3 (2022)

=== Extended plays ===
- Gewingchum - Self Released, MP3 (2015) / Specialist Subject Records, Cassette (2017)
- These Things Are Not That Fun - Self Released, MP3 (2015) / Specialist Subject Records, Cassette (2017)
- The Summer I Got Good At Guitar - Specialist Subject Records, 12" EP, Cassette, MP3 (2021)
- Fresh Comes Alive! - Self-released, MP3 (2022)
- Merch Girl - Specialist Subject Records (UK) / Get Better Records (USA), MP3 (2024)

=== Singles ===
- "Daytime" / "Nighttime" - Specialist Subject Records, 7", MP3 (2018)
- "Willa" - Specialist Subject Records, MP3 (2019)
- "Going to Brighton" - Specialist Subject Records, MP3 (2019)
- "New Girl" - Specialist Subject Records, MP3 (2019)
- "Cinema Woes" - Specialist Subject Records, MP3 (2019)
- "Girl Clout" - Specialist Subject Records, MP3 (2021)
