= Sound limiter =

Environmental noise control device

A sound limiter or noise limiter is a digital device fitted with a microphone to measure the sound pressure level of environmental noise, expressed by the decibel logarithmic unit (dB). If the environmental noise level as measured by the microphone exceeds a pre-set level for a certain amount of time (e.g. 5 seconds), the limiter’s circuitry will cut the power supply to the musical equipment and PA system requiring the venue's staff to reset the system.

Sound limiters are commonly installed at live music venues, including private venues and particularly those that host wedding receptions with live wedding bands.

The visual indicator on the limiter works most commonly on a “traffic light” system: green = no problem, amber = sound levels approaching the threshold, red = threshold breached. If the light stays red for more than a few seconds, then the limiter will take action and cut the power.

Sound limiters are often set quite aggressively, effectively making it impossible for some types of performance to take place without tripping the limiter, for example an unamplified drumkit may trip a limiter on its own. While limiters can help reduce disturbance of other properties nearby, if set badly they can spoil live performances.

Although there is no legal requirement to install a sound limiter, they are a reasonably inexpensive piece of equipment, which can help prevent complaints as part of a sound control plan and also protect the health of staff by ensuring that the levels do not exceed those set by The Control of Noise at Work regulations 2005.
