= Get Better Records =

American record label

- Founded: 2009
- Founder: Alex Lichtenauer, Nick King
- Distributor: Redeye Distribution
- Genre: Punk; Hardcore punk Indie rock Alternative rock Experimental music
- Country of origin: United States
- Location: Philadelphia, Pennsylvania; Los Angeles, California; Brooklyn, New York
- Official website: www.getbetterrecords.com

Get Better Records is an American independent record label based in Philadelphia, Pennsylvania.

== History and background ==
The label was founded by Alex Lichtenauer and Nick King in 2009 in Keene, New Hampshire. King left the label in 2010; Get Better is now run by Lichtenauer.

Its stated aim is to "reverse the constant underrepresentation of the queer arts community, with a specific focus on punk, hardcore, and alternative rock music". An article in Philadelphia similarly described it as "queer forward".

== Releases and events ==
In 2017, the label released a compilation album titled A Benefit Comp to Help Pay Medical Bills for Those Activists Fighting Against Fascism and Racism, the proceeds were donated to victims of the Charlottesville car attack and Hurricane Harvey. In June 2020, the label donated its Bandcamp profits to a bail fund based in Philadelphia and Black and Pink.

The label hosts an annual festival "Get Better Fest"

== Artists ==
=== Current ===
- Alice Bag Band
- Bacchae
- Cayetana
- Control Top
- Flung
- Fresh
- Fucked Up
- Evan Greer
- The HIRS Collective
- La Dispute
- Lande Hekt
- Nervus
- Old City
- Pictoria Vark
- Pg. 99
- Remember Sports
- Sheer Mag
- Suzie True
- Thou
- Vial
- John-Allison Weiss

=== Alumni ===
- Empath
- Potty Mouth
- Ramshackle Glory
- Worriers
