= Personal Best (band) =

English punk rock band

- Origin: Bristol, England
- Genres: Indie rock; punk rock
- Years active: 2013–present
- Labels: Specialist Subject Records; Dovetown; Sheer Luck
- Members: Robin Gatt; Jason Cavalier
- Past members: El Morgan; Tom Baker; Lou Hanman; Tom Hussey

Personal Best are an English punk band from Bristol. Founded by songwriter Robin Gatt in 2013, they have had several lineup changes in the time since. They have currently released two full-length albums; Arnos Vale (2015) and What You At (2019).

== History ==
Personal Best was founded by Robin Gatt as a vehicle for their songwriting in Bristol in 2013. The original lineup included Tom Hussey (also of the band Attack! Vipers!) on bass and Lou Hanman (also of the band Caves) on drums. This trio recorded the debut EP released on Specialist Subject Records in 2014.

On 30 March 2015, they released their debut album Arnos Vale, recorded with producer and engineer Gethin Pearson in mid-Wales.

In 2016, Lou Hanman and Tom Hussey left and were replaced by Jason Cavalier on drums and Tom Baker on bass. Portsmouth based musician El Morgan joined as a second guitarist, rounding out a new four-piece lineup. On 29 April 2016, they released a single on the German label Yo-Yo Records.

In summer of 2018, Personal Best recorded their second album at Morgan's recording studio Southsea Sound. On 14 June 2019 the album, What You At, was released by Dovetown Records in the UK and Sheer Luck Records in the US.

== Discography ==
=== Albums ===
- Arnos Vale - Specialist Subject Records, 12" LP, CD, MP3 (2015)
- What You At - Dovetown Records (UK) / Sheer Luck Records (USA), 12" LP, CD, MP3 (2019)

=== Extended plays ===
- The Lovin' EP - Specialist Subject Records, 12" EP, MP3 (2014)

=== Singles ===
- "I Go Quiet" - Yo-Yo Records, 7" single, MP3 (2016)
- "Rollies" split with Bruising - Too Pure Records, 7" single, MP3 (2017)
