= Happy Accidents (band) =

British pop punk band

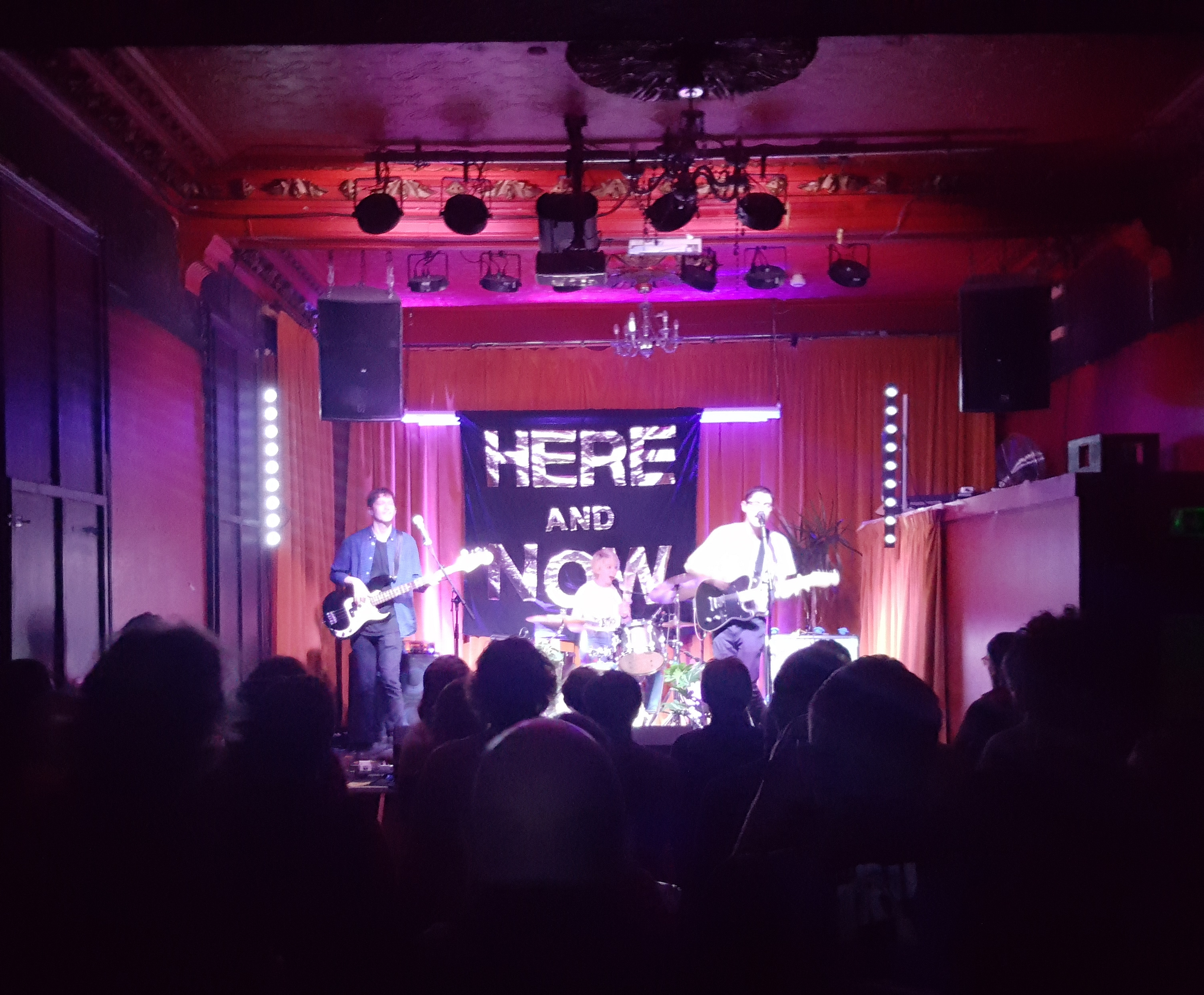

Background information
- Origin: Southampton, England
- Genres: Pop Punk, Indie Rock
- Years active: 2013–present
- Label: Alcopop! Records
- Members: Rich Mandell; Phoebe Cross
- Past members: Neil Mandell
- Website: www.happyaccidents.band

Happy Accidents is a British band based in London, consisting of Rich Mandell (guitar and vocals) and Phoebe Cross (drums and vocals). They began as a pop punk trio, with Rich's brother Neil Mandell on bass. By their second album they had developed in a more indie rock direction. They have currently released three full-length albums, mostly on Alcopop! Records.

== History ==
Happy Accidents was formed in Southampton in 2013 by siblings Neil (bass) and Rich Mandell (guitar and vocals), and Phoebe Cross (drums and vocals).

After releasing an EP and a split 7-inch on Don't Ask Records in 2014, and relocating to London, the band signed to Alcopop! Records and released their debut album You Might Be Right on 1 July 2016.

Their second LP Everything But The Here and Now was released on 16 February 2018, also by Alcopop! Records. It was recorded with Matthew "MJ" Johnson of Hookworms at his studio Suburban Home.

Neil Mandell left the band amicably in 2019, to focus on other things. The band have continued as a duo.

The third Happy Accidents album, Sprawling, was released on 29 May 2020. It was self-produced, and released on vinyl and digital download by the band, without a label, via Bandcamp.com.

Happy Accidents announced in May 2021 that they would cease to play and tour as a live band, but that they might still record and release new material. Both Mandell and Cross are currently members of Me Rex, and Cross is also a member of Cheerbleederz.

Cross and Mandell married in 2023.

In July 2024 Happy Accidents announced the release of their fourth album, Edit Undo, on 27 September 2024. This would once again be put out by Alcopop! Records.

== Discography ==
=== Albums ===
- You Might Be Right - Alcopop! Records, 12-inch LP, CD, MP3 (2016)
- Everything But The Here and Now - Alcopop! Records, 12-inch LP, CD, MP3 (2018)
- Sprawling - Self released, 12-inch LP, download (2020)
- Edit Undo - Alcopop! Records, CD, MP3 (2024)

=== EPS ===
- Not Yet Jaded - Don't Ask Records, Cassette, MP3 (2014)
- cgwarmth - Self released, MP3 (2022)

=== Split releases ===
- Split with Austeros, Isaac, Young Attenborough - Don't Ask Records, 7-inch, MP3 (2014)
