= Nervus =

English anarcho-punk band

- Origin: Watford, England
- Genres: Indie rock; punk rock
- Years active: 2014–present
- Label: Big Scary Monsters
- Members: Em Foster; Paul Etienne; Jack Kenny; Lucinda Livingstone
- Past members: Karl Woods

Nervus are an English anarcho-punk band from Watford. The current lineup is Em Foster (guitar, vocals), Paul Etienne (keyboards), Lucinda Livingstone (bass), and Jack Kenny (drums). They have released four full-length albums; Permanent Rainbow (2016), Everything Dies (2018), Tough Crowd (2019), and The Evil One (2022).

== History ==
Nervus began as a bedroom songwriting project for singer and guitarist Em Foster in 2014, before expanding to a full band with the addition of Paul Etienne on keyboards, Jack Kenny on drums and Karl Woods on bass. They released their first album, Permanent Rainbow, on Venn Records, a label run by members of the band Gallows, in 2016.

In early 2018, the band announced they would be releasing their second album Everything Dies on Big Scary Monsters on 9 March 2018. In mid 2018, Karl Woods left the band and Lucinda Livingstone, also of the Brighton band Cultdreams, joined as bassist. On 27 September 2019, Nervus released their third album Tough Crowd, again on Big Scary Monsters.

On 24 June 2022 the band released their fourth album The Evil One on US label Get Better Records.

== Discography ==
=== Albums ===
- Permanent Rainbow - Venn Records, 12" LP, CD, MP3 (2016)
- Everything Dies - Big Scary Monsters, 12" LP, CD, MP3 (2018)
- Tough Crowd - Big Scary Monsters, 12" LP, CD, MP3 (2019)
- The Evil One - Get Better Records, 12" LP, MP3 (2022)

=== Singles and EPs ===
- "We Want Your Blood" / "Grave Digging" - Self release, CD & Zine, MP3 (2020)
- "What If The Problem Was You?" - Self release, CD & Zine, MP3 (2020)
