= The Bennies =

Australian band

- Also known as: Madonna (2009–2011)
- Origin: Melbourne, Victoria
- Genres: Punk rock, ska, reggae
- Years active: 2009–present
- Labels: Vinnies Records, Pool House Records, Poison City Records
- Spinoffs: Loser, Previous Future
- Members: Anty Horgan; DJ SNESmega; Nick Williams; Ollie Roots; Dougie Rankin; Joe Larwood
- Past members: Steve Lavery; Christos Salaoras; Craig Selak; David Beaumont; Jules Rozenbergs; Nick Thunder; Marco Foxlee; Sam Faulkner
- Website: thebennies.com.au

The Bennies are an Australian ska punk band originally from Melbourne, Victoria and currently based on the Gold Coast, Queensland. Forming in 2009, the band has under-gone multiple line-up changes; lead vocalist and synth player Anty Horgan is the band's only remaining original member. Self-described as "psychedelic reggae ska doom metal punk rock from Hell," the band are known for their high-energy live shows and their mix of genres including dub, punk rock and heavy metal. To date, the band have released five studio albums and two EPs.

== History ==
The band originally formed in 2009 under the name Madonna. Under this name, the band released a self-titled collection of demo recordings on CD in 2010 before changing their name to The Bennies the following year due to legal issues concerning the use of the name. Under their new name, The Bennies would release their debut album Party Party Party! on 3 September 2011 via Jackknife Music. In 2012, the band underwent their first line-up change after guitarist Steve Lavery departed from the band and was replaced by Christos "Souv" Salaoras. Following a tour of Japan later that year, Salaoras also left The Bennies. His replacement was Jules Rozenbergs, who had previously played in Melbourne punk bands Kimbo and The Gun Runners. This line-up would remain intact for the next six years, with their first release being 2013's Better Off Dread EP on April 20, 2013. This was followed by Rainbows in Space, the band's second studio album, which was released in November. It marked the band's first release with Poison City Records, who would put out every Bennies release until 2017.

In 2014, the band released their second EP, Heavy Disco. To promote the release, the band appeared on triple j's Like a Version segment in February 2015. The band performed a stripped-back version of "Heavy Disco", as well as a cover of TISM's "He'll Never Be An) Ol' Man River." Damian Cowell, who was a member of TISM, gave his approval of the cover to the band and performed the song with them live in 2016. The Bennies themselves would later contribute to Cowell's second studio album as Damian Cowell's Disco Machine, 2017's Get Yer Dag On!, featuring on the song "365 Lemmys" alongside Henry Wagons.

In 2015, a new single titled "Party Machine" was released. The song ended up being their most successful single to date, and was voted into the Triple J Hottest 100 of 2015 at number 88. The song was the lead single from their third studio album, Wisdom Machine, which was released on 25 March 2016. The album spawned a further three singles – "Legalise (But Don't Tax)," "Detroit Rock Ciggies" and "Corruption" – with music videos being made for the latter two.

The band released a single, "Get High Like an Angel", in late 2017, and toured Australia in support of it. It would serve as the opening track on The Bennies' fourth studio album, Natural Born Chillers. The album was released on 2 February 2018 and was the band's first release through Pool House Records. In March 2018, it was announced that bassist, vocalist and founding member Craig Selak would be departing from the band following two remaining festival shows. His replacement was Nick Williams, who the band had met years prior from touring with Williams' band Foxtrot. Selak would go on to form LOSER, alongside former Apart From This frontman Tim Maxwell and former Smith Street Band drummer Chris Cowburn.

The band continued to tour in support of Natural Born Chillers throughout 2018, releasing music videos for "Dreamkillers" and "Trip Report." In January 2019, the band announced that longtime friend Graham Leach – AKA DJ Snes Mega – would be joining the band on a permanent basis. The band's first release as a quintet was a single, "Waiting for Dave", which was released on 11 January 2019.

Horgan released his debut solo album, Rudeboy, in December 2020. In June 2022, the band announced that Beaumont, Rozenbergs and Williams would be leaving the band following a final show the following month in Melbourne. Horgan and Leach would continue on under the moniker and announced a new line-up in November of 2022, which included guitarist Ollie Roots, bassist Nick Thunder and drummer Marco Foxlee. The band played its first show with the new line-up that same month at Vinnies Dive Bar on the Gold Coast. On 24 February 2024, the band supported TISM at a secret show at the Pier Bandroom in the Melbourne suburb of Frankston. The following week, they released a new single entitled "Let's Have a Party". The band's fifth album, You Can't Put Out This Fire, was released in April 2025.

Nick Thunder left the band in August 2025, with Williams rejoining as bassist in his place. Also in 2025, it was announced that Bennies alum Craig Selak, Jules Rozenbergs and David Beaumont had formed a new band under the moniker of Previous Future.

== Band members ==
Current members

- Anty Horgan – lead vocals, synthesizer (2009–present)
- Graham "DJ SNESmega" Leach – turntables, backing vocals, guitar (2019–present; occasional live shows 2014–2018)
- Ollie Roots – guitar, backing vocals (2022–present)
- Nick Williams – bass, backing and lead vocals (2018–2022; one-off show 2024, 2025-present)
- Dougie Rankin – trombone, backing vocals (2024–present; occasional live shows 2016–2024)
- Joe Larwood - drums (2025–present)

Former members

- Steve Lavery – guitar, backing vocals (2009–2012)
- Christos Salaoras – guitar, backing vocals (2012)
- Craig Selak – bass, lead and backing vocals (2009–2018)
- David "Bowie" Beaumont – drums (2009–2022)
- Julien "King Jules" Rozenbergs – guitar, backing and lead vocals (2012–2022)
- Marco Foxlee – drums (2022–2023)
- Dom Ryan – drums (2023–2024; touring)
- Nick Thunder – bass, backing vocals (2022–2025)
- Sam Faulkner – drums (2024-2025)

== Discography ==
=== Albums ===
List of albums, with selected details
Title	Details
Party! Party! Party!	Released: September 2011; Format: CD, LP, digital; Label: Jackknife Music (Jackknife #6)
Rainbows in Space	Released: 2013; Format: CD, LP, digital; Label: Poison City Records (PCR076)
Wisdom Machine	Released: 2016; Format: CD, LP, digital; Label: Poison City Records (PCR117)
Natural Born Chillers	Released: 2018; Format: CD, LP, digital; Label: Pool House Records (PHR007)
You Can't Put Out This Fire	Released: 2025; Format: CD, LP, digital; Label: Vinnies Records

=== Extended Plays ===
List of albums, with selected details
Title	Details
Better Off Dread	Released: 2013; Format: 7" LP, Digital; Label: Jackknife Music (Jackknife #8)
Heavy Disco	Released: 2014; Format: CD, 7" LP, Digital; Label: Poison City Records (PCR099)

== Awards and nominations ==
=== Music Victoria Awards ===
The Music Victoria Awards (previously known as The Age EG Awards and The Age Music Victoria Awards) are an annual awards night celebrating Victorian music.

Year	Nominee / work	Award	Result	Ref.
Music Victoria Awards of 2014	Rainbows in Space	Best Heavy Album	Nominated	
