= Me Rex =

British indie rock band

- Origin: London, England
- Genres: Emo; Indie rock; Indie pop
- Years active: 2015–present
- Labels: Big Scary Monsters; Rose Coloured Records
- Members: Myles McCabe; Rich Mandell; Phoebe Cross
- Past members: Kathryn Woods
- Website: www.merex.co.uk

Me Rex, stylised as ME REX, is a British indie rock band formed in London by songwriter Myles McCabe. Initially a solo endeavour, it has now expanded to a full band with the addition of Rich Mandell (Happy Accidents) and Phoebe Cross (Happy Accidents, Cheerbleederz). They have released two studio albums and multiple EPs.

== History ==
Myles McCabe originally formed Me Rex in 2015 as a solo project, though occasionally working with collaborators. Between then and 2018 he self-released six EPs each named after a dinosaur or prehistoric mammal. Me Rex toured England with anti-folk acts Crywank and Perkie in the summer of 2018.

In 2019, McCabe formed a full band with Kathryn Woods, a bandmate from Fresh, and friends Rich Mandell and Phoebe Cross from the band Happy Accidents. This newly-formed band both re-recorded various older songs and EPs, and also went on to produce an entirely new, full-length album entitled Megabear.

Via the record label Big Scary Monsters, Me Rex re-released Triceratops digitally in August 2020 as a double EP with a re-recorded version of Stegosaurus.

In February 2021, the band released a shuffle album entitled Megabear. Rather than a traditional album of distinct songs, Megabear consists of "52 short song snippets, all of them in a similar key and time signature so they can be shuffled in any order to create one continuous song with no beginning or end".

In February 2022, Me Rex released an EP titled Pterodactyl containing all new material. The following month, they announced that another brand new EP titled Plesiosaur would be released on 30 May of the same year.

On 20 October, their debut full-length album, Giant Elk, (Note: Depending on the classification of Megabear, Giant Elk could be considered their second album, but a preponderance of outlets described the latter as their debut studio album.) was released via Big Scary Monsters. It was recorded through 2022 at four different studios, being the first time the band could record music outside of lockdown since before pandemic's onset. Me Rex supported the album with three singles and a tour across the United Kingdom.

In April 2024, the band announced the release of their ninth EP, Smilodon, on 1 May. It was preceded by the single "Goodbye Forever".

In December 2025, the band announced an England tour set for March 2026, with supports from bands like Percstreet, Arms & Hearts and The Pypes.

== Discography ==
=== Albums ===
- Megabear (2021) – Big Scary Monsters; 12" vinyl, digital
- Giant Elk (2023) – Big Scary Monsters; 12" vinyl, CD, digital

=== Extended plays ===
- Triceratops (2015) – Self-released; digital
  - Re-released by Big Scary Monsters in 2020 (Double EP as Triceratops / Stegosaurus; 12" vinyl, digital)
- Stegosaurus (2016) – Self-released; digital
  - Re-released by Big Scary Monsters in 2020 (Double EP as Triceratops / Stegosaurus; 12" vinyl, digital)
- Wooly Mammoth [sic] (2016) – Self-released; digital
  - Re-released by Rose Coloured Records in 2020 (Double EP as Woolly Mammoth / Woolly Rhino; cassette, digital)
- Brontosaurus (2017) – Self-released; digital
- Wooly Rhino [sic] (2017) – Self-released; digital
  - Re-released by Rose Coloured Records in 2020 (Double EP as Woolly Mammoth / Woolly Rhino; cassette, digital)
- Pterodactyl (2018) – Self-released; digital
- Pterodactyl (2022) – Big Scary Monsters; 12" vinyl (Double EP as Pterodactyl/Plesiosaur), digital (Note: Re-recorded from the 2018 version, with revised lyrics, an updated tracklist, and new album cover art.)
- Plesiosaur (2022) – Big Scary Monsters; 12" vinyl (Double EP as Pterodactyl/Plesiosaur), digital
- Smilodon (2024) – Big Scary Monsters

=== Singles ===
- Sugar Rex (2020) (split release with Sugar Rush!) – Rose Coloured Records; cassette, digital
- "Galena" (2021)
- "Eutherians (Ultramarine)" (2023)
- "Giant Giant Giant" (2023)
- "Infinity Worm" (2023)
- "Goodbye Forever" (2024)
- '"Canada Water" (2024)
- "Angel Hammer" (2026)
- "Protection Runes" (2026)
