= Specialist Subject Records =

English independent record label

- Founded: 2007; 19 years ago
- Founder: Andrew Horne, Kay Stanley
- Genre: Punk, Indie Rock
- Country of origin: United Kingdom
- Location: Leeds (2007), Exeter (2009–2017), Bristol (2017–present)
- Official website: specialistsubjectrecords.co.uk

Specialist Subject Records is an English independent record label initially founded in Leeds in 2007, but based largely in Exeter then Bristol since being revived in 2009. They have been described as a "powerhouse" of DIY Indie Rock.

== History ==
Specialist Subject started in 2007 to release one 7" by the band Magnus Magnusson.

In 2009 the label was revived in Exeter as a method of self releasing Horne's band Bangers, as well as those by friends' bands such as Caves. For some time Specialist Subject had an office in the centre of the city. Since opening a record shop in Bristol in August 2017 the label has been run from its premises upstairs at the music venue Exchange in the Old Market area of Bristol.

The label has mostly seen releases by up-and-coming British bands such as Doe, Muncie Girls, and Fresh; but it has also put out the UK editions of albums by acts from other anglophone countries such as The Smith Street Band (Australia), Jeff Rosenstock (USA), and Pillow Queens (Ireland).

== Artists with releases by Specialist Subject ==
- Above Them
- Adult Magic
- AJJ
- American Enthusiasm
- The Arteries
- Austeros
- Bad Sleep
- Bangers
- Caves
- Charmpit
- Doe
- Dogeyed
- Don't Worry
- The Fairweather Band
- Fresh
- Garden Centre
- Grand Pop
- Great Cynics
- Hamburger
- Hard Girls
- Hovvdy
- Jesus and his Judgemental Father
- Live, Do Nothing
- Martha
- Muncie Girls
- Neurotic Fiction
- Onsind
- Pale Angels
- Personal Best
- Pillow Queens
- Jeff Rosenstock
- Shit Present
- Slingshot Dakota
- The Smith Street Band
- Soot Sprite
- Ssssnakes
- Supermilk
- Toodles & the Hectic Pity
- Twisted
- Witching Waves
- Woahnows
