= The Ethical Debating Society =

English DIY punk/post-riot grrrl group

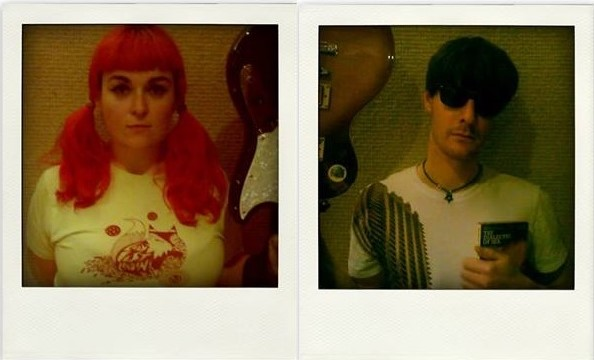

Background information
- Origin: London
- Genres: Riot grrrl, punk, post punk
- Years active: 2009–present
- Labels: Odd Box, Tuff Enuff, HHBTM
- Members: Tegan Christmas; Kris Martin; Lu
- Past members: Eli Tupa; Rob Macabre; Lauren Darling; Chris Morris; Su
- Website: TEDS Bandcamp

The Ethical Debating Society (aka T.E.D.S.) are a three-piece DIY punk, post-riot grrrl group from London. They have been described as "one of the most exciting DIY bands" in the UK.

== History ==
Initially a solo project for vocalist/guitarist Tegan Christmas, The Ethical Debating Society formed as a band in 2009 with Lauren Darling (guitar) and Chris Morris (drums). They received an early name-check in The Guardian from Everett True. Recordings made with producer Ant Chapman were initially unreleased, although two tracks were included on a later EP. By 2010 Darling and Morris had left and Tegan continued with a varying line up until the group settled as Tegan with Eli Tupa and Kris Martin in 2013.

The band played a number of early gigs around the UK queercore scene, with Ste McCabe, The Younger Lovers and others; following an appearance on Brighton queercore label Tuff Enuff Records’s 2012 compilation Why Diet When You Could Riot? gigs with Shrag and Tunabunny led to a split single with London’s Skinny Girl Diet on US label Happy Happy Birthday To Me Records in 2013. A cassette/download EP on Tuff Enuff - "Hens Teeth" - followed in 2014.

In 2015, The Ethical Debating Society's debut album New Sense was released on Odd Box Records following audio and video previews, and received positive reviews from SoundsXP, Collapse Board, Louder Than War and others, with radio support including BBC Radio 6, Dandelion and Artrocker Radio. The album was produced by Mark Jasper at Sound Savers studio. Album track "Razor Party" (written by former drummer Rob) was voted #32 in the 2015 John Peel memorial 'Festive 50' compiled by Dandelion Radio.

The band supported Jack Off Jill at their final show, at Heaven in London, and played with Shonen Knife on the London date of that band's 2016 tour. They played at Indietracks 2015, and have also played with The Wolfhounds, The Nightingales, The Homosexuals, Hagar the Womb, Prolapse, Bis, Lung Leg and Darren Hayman.

In 2013, T.E.D.S. were named as a 'band to watch' by Londonist. In 2017, they were included in Clash magazine's list of "favourite new groups" alongside Shopping and others. In 2019 Contactmusic called them "one of the best" London DIY bands.

== Discography ==
=== Albums ===
- New Sense – Odd Box Records (UK) 12-inch LP/MP3 (2015)

=== EPs/Singles ===
- Live EP, self-released, CDr (2011)
- Split EP, HHBTM Records, 7-inch (2013) [with Skinny Girl Diet]
- Hens Teeth EP, Tuff Enuff Records, MC/DL (2014)
- "London Particular", self-released, DD (2017)
- Mutual Indecision EP, Radical Possibilities, MC/DL (2023)

=== Compilation appearances ===
- "Kill You Last" on Why Diet When You Can Diet, Tuff Enuff Records, LP/DD (2012)
- "Kill You Last" on MC12, HHBTM Records, MC (2012)
- "Future Imperfect" on Keroleen Mixtape #1, Keroleen Records, MC/DD (2015)
- "Cover Up" on Indietracks Compilation 2015, Indietracks, DD (2015)
- "Riderrr" on Odd Box Weekender V, Odd Box, DD (2015)
- "Run Rudolph Run" on Riot Grrrl Christmas, Cleopatra Records, CD/DD (2015)
- "List of Requirements" on Odd Box 2015, Odd Box, DD (2015)
- "Creosote Ideas" on Don't Be Left Without Us, 2CD (2016)
- "Poor Liam" on Loud Women - Volume One, Loud Women Records, CD (2017)
- "Paywall" on Kobayashi I: Intergalactic Champions, Kobayashi Nights Records, CD/DD (2017)
- "Yes" on Salvage: A DIY Pop Compilation, Move Under Your Own Power, MC/DD (2018)
- "Emoticon" on #SolidarityNotSilence Compilation (Pt1) (2019)

== Line up ==
=== Current ===
- Tegan Christmas (vocals, guitar)
- Lu (drums)
- Kris Martin (guitar, vocals)

=== Previous ===
- Eli Tupa (drums, 2013-2019)
- Rob Macabre (drums, 2010-2012)
- Dave Burbidge (drums, 2013)
- Su (percussion/bvs, 2010-2013)
- Lauren Darling (guitar/vocals, 2009)
- Chris Morris (drums, 2009)
