= Tuff Enuff Records =

British record label

Tuff Enuff Records was a British queer/riot grrrl record label based in Brighton, England.

== History ==
Tuff Enuff was established in 2012 as a spin-off from associated club night Riots Not Diets, and specialises in releasing DIY punk and lo-fi/underground music. The label is considered to be in the tradition of Slampt Records as well as more recent British queercore labels such as Homocrime and Irrk.

First release was compilation album Why Diet When You Could Riot?, which was favourably reviewed in Maximum Rocknroll and elsewhere and included tracks from Ste McCabe and Trash Kit. Two further compilations followed, 2013's Carry On Rioting and 2014's I Know Why the Caged Grrrl Sings, including tracks by Shrag and Shopping, respectively.

The label released a series of well-received cassette EPs by bands such as Frau, No Ditching, Dog Legs, The Ethical Debating Society and Big Joanie; vinyl singles by Men Oh Pause and Slum Of Legs; as well as vinyl albums by Roseanne Barr, Daskinsey4 and Ye Nuns, the latter band featuring Debbie Smith, Charley Stone and former members of Mambo Taxi and thee Headcoatees playing covers of songs by The Monks.

== Artists ==
- Alison’s Birthday
- As Ondas
- Big Joanie
- Crumbs
- Daskinsey4
- Dog Legs
- The Ethical Debating Society
- Frau
- Grubs
- King Alfred, Man Of Leisure
- Martha
- Men Oh Pause
- The Middle Ones
- Milky Wimpshake
- Molar
- Neurotic Fiction
- No Ditching
- Roseanne Barr
- Slum Of Legs
- Try The Pie
- Two White Cranes
- Ye Nuns
