= Indietracks =

Indie pop Music Festival

Coordinates: 53.0632°N 1.3993°W

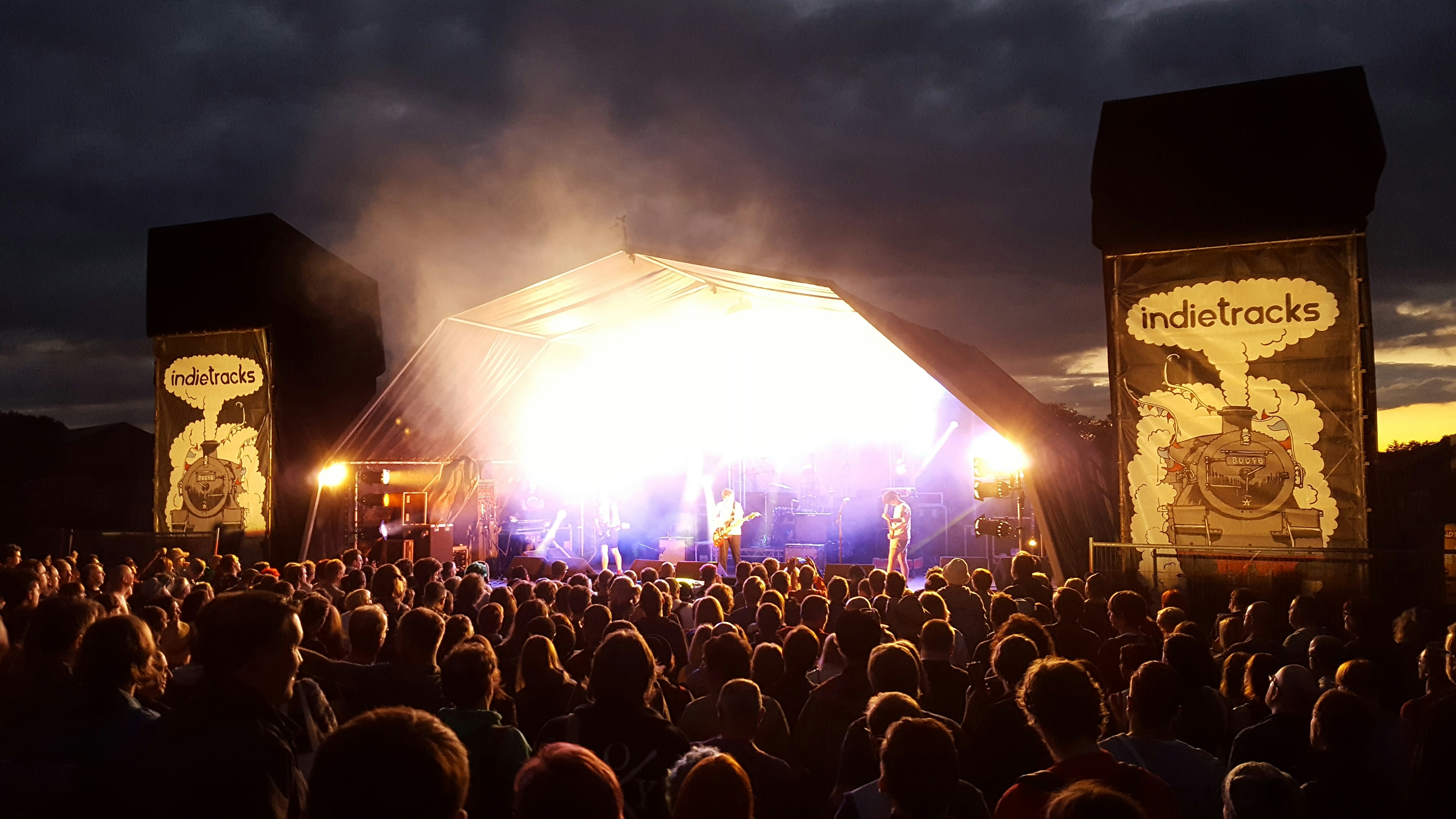
- The Spook School headlining the Friday night at Indietracks 2016
- Genre: Indiepop
- Dates: July
- Locations: Midland Railway in Butterley, Derbyshire, England
- Years active: 2007- 2019
- Founders: Stuart Mackay
- Website: http://www.indietracks.co.uk/

Indietracks was an annual indie pop music festival at the Midland Railway in Butterley, Derbyshire, England. The main site was located at Swanwick Junction. Bands played in variety of locations, including a restored church, in a train shed, and on the moving trains themselves. The event was staffed by volunteers, with the proceeds from the festival going towards the upkeep and renovation of the site and trains.

The first indiepop event held at the centre was in April 2007, organised by steam train restorer Stuart Mackay. Indietracks was established, as a two-day festival in summer that year.

Reviewing the 2011 festival, Malcolm Jack of The Guardian described the artists as "so obscure you have to wonder if they've even heard of themselves". He writes, "Indietracks does little to dispel the notion of indie-pop fans being given to whimsy. It's the annual gathering of the twee tribe – think lovers of a broad church of outsider sounds from C86-inspired three-chord shambling to riot grrrl and anti-folk."

The festival inspired compilation albums, released annually.

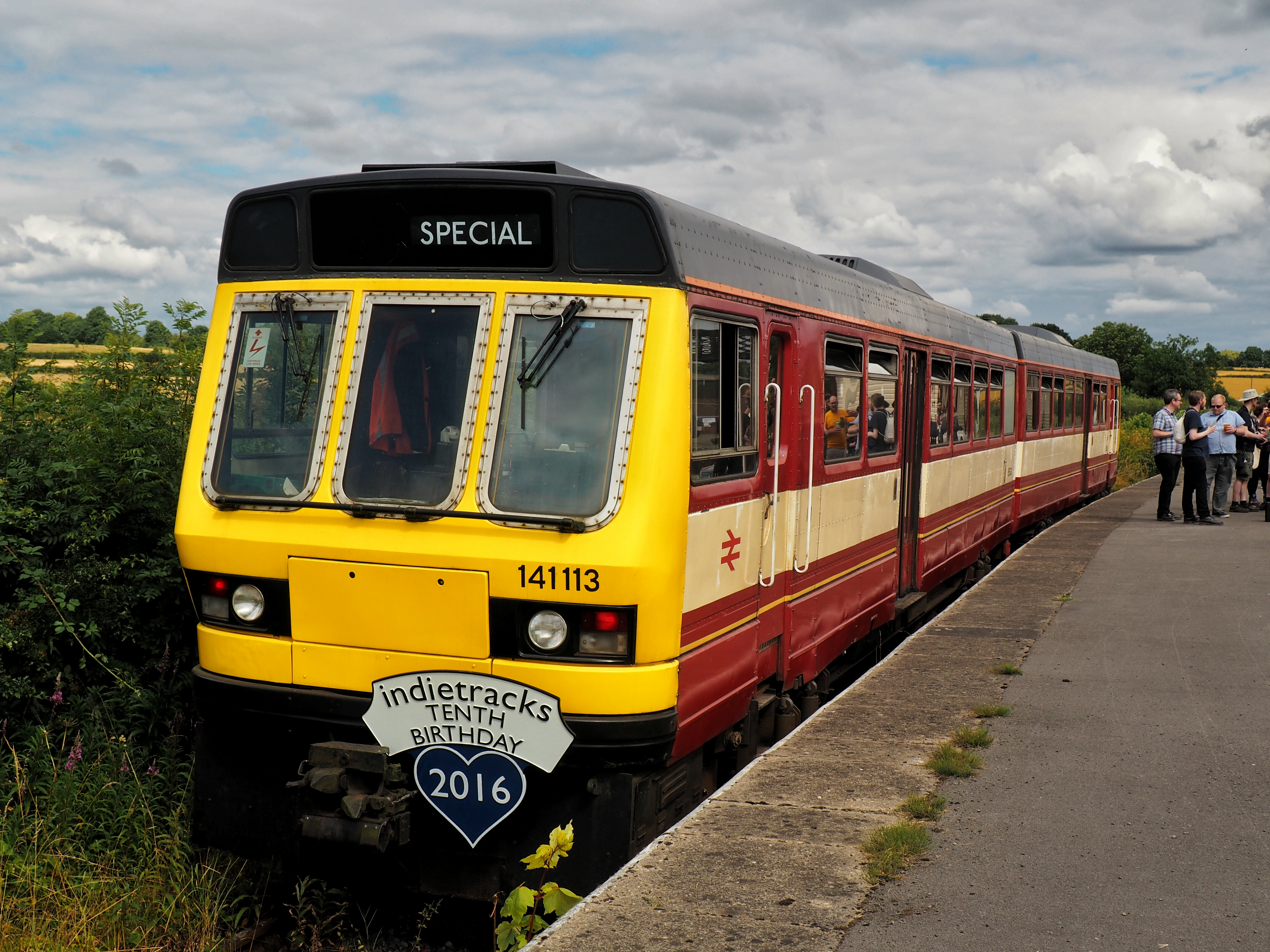
A Class 141 Pacer at Indietracks 2016

The 2020 festival was cancelled due to the coronavirus pandemic. In November 2021, the festival organisers announced that 2019's event would be the last Indietracks, citing the pandemic as a primary reason for the festival not continuing.

== Line-ups ==
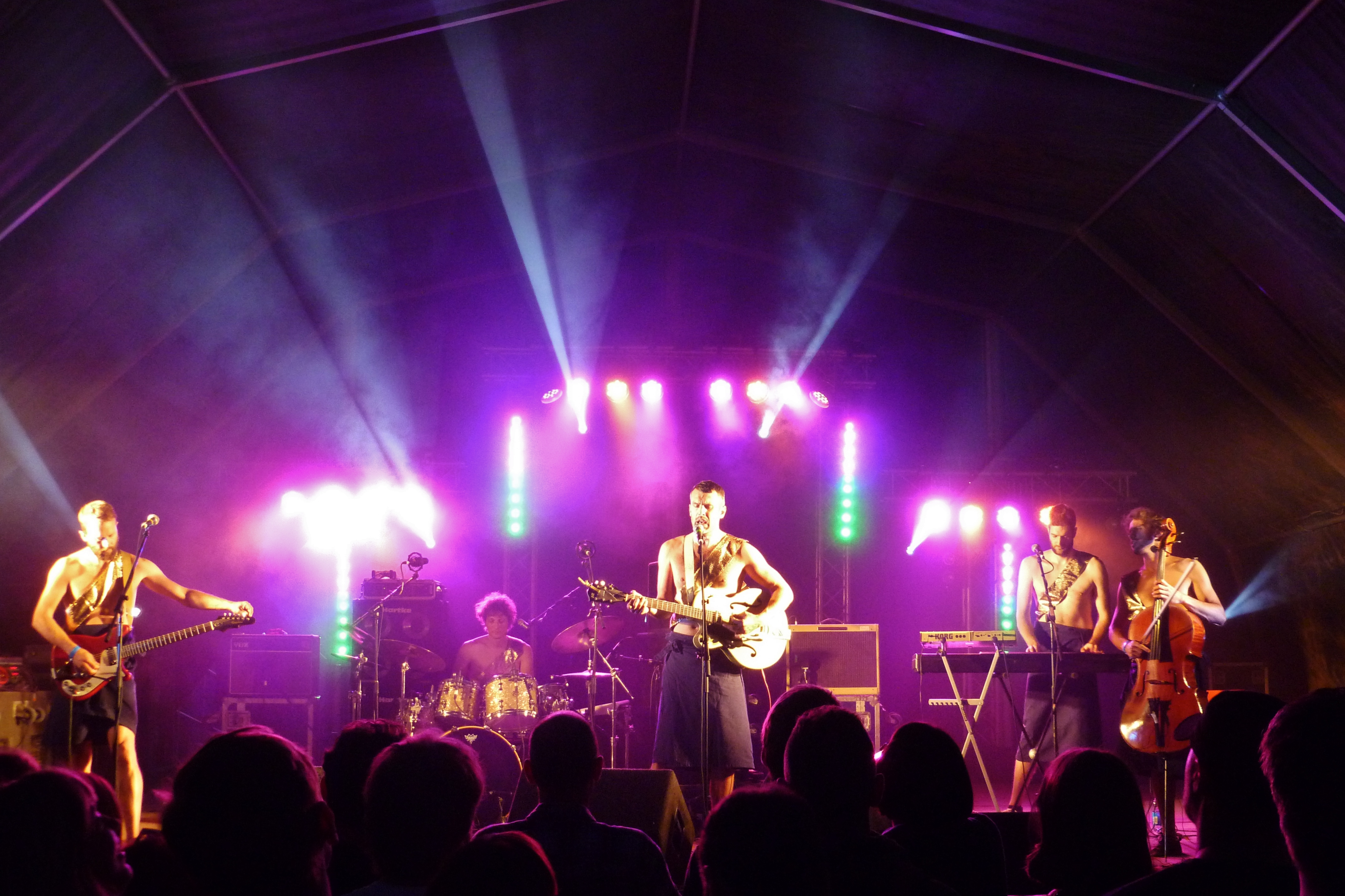
The Hidden Cameras in 2014

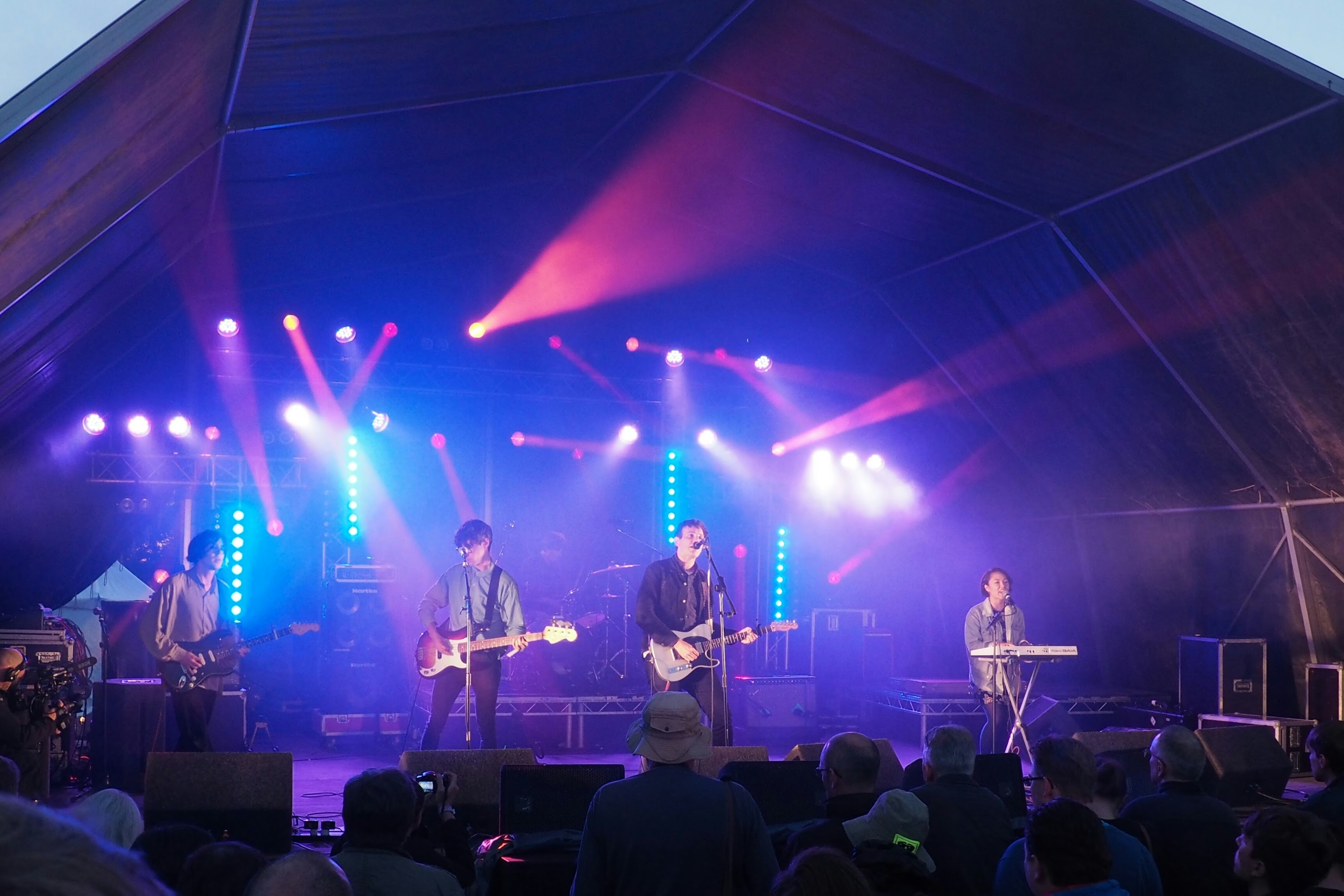
The Pains of Being Pure at Heart in 2015

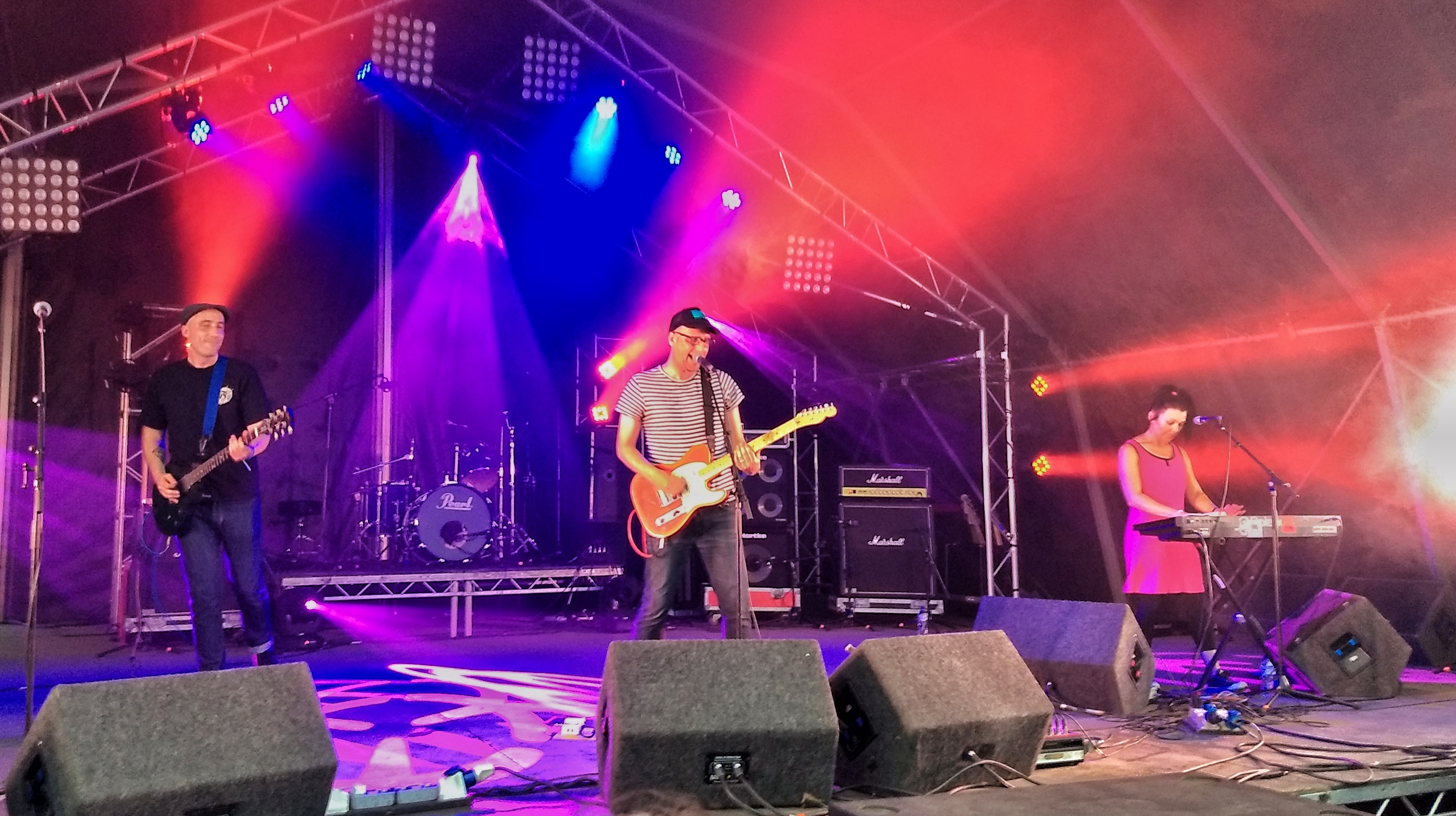
Bis in 2019

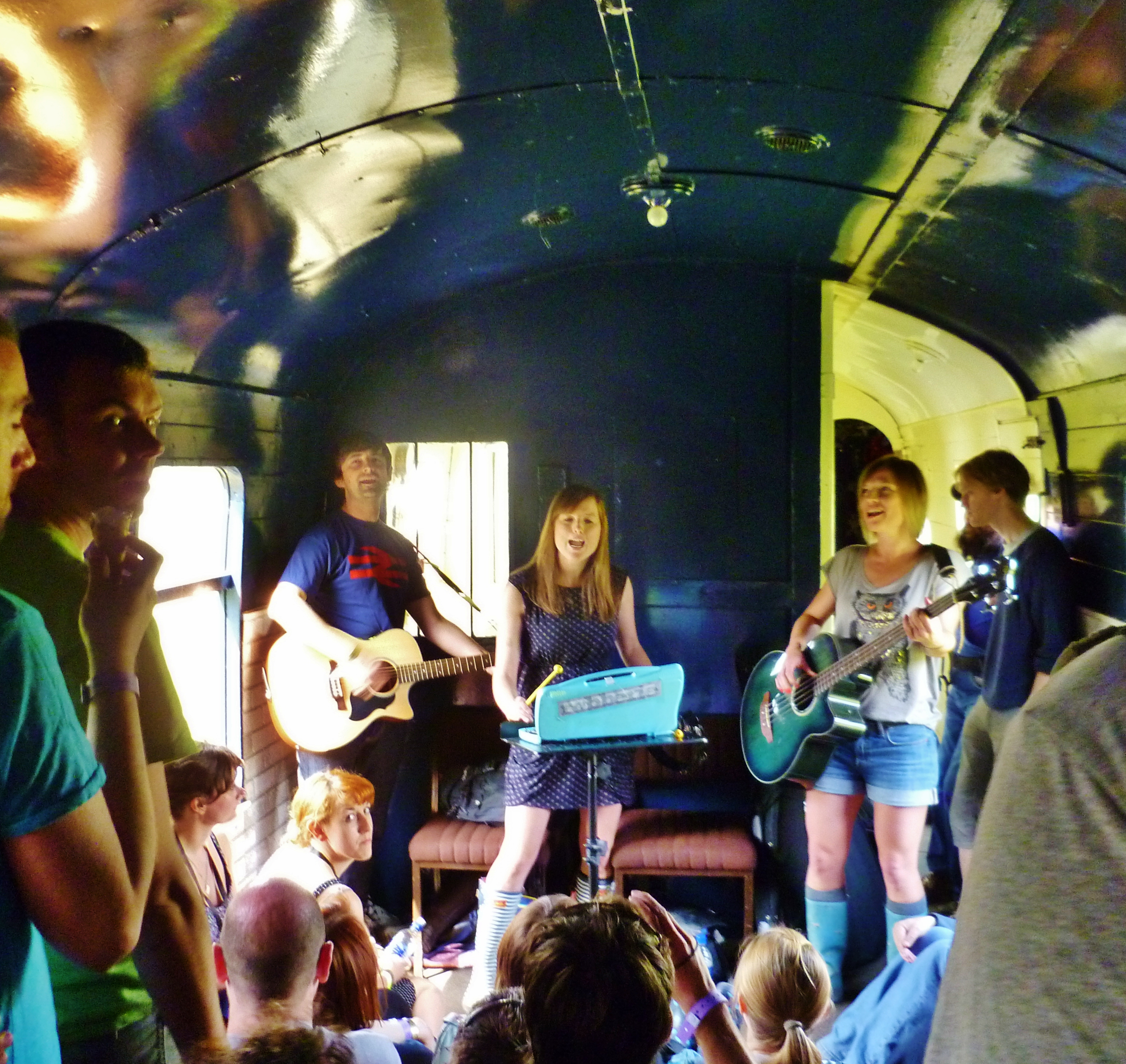
Robberie playing on the train stage in 2012

Date	Bands
24-26 July 2020	Event cancelled, but previously published line-up was: Los Campesinos!, Whyte Horses, Pip Blom, Rozi Plain, Shopping, Josie Long, Nervus, The Just Joans, Tigercats, Ex-Void, Erica Freas, The School, Otis Mensah, Martha Ffion, Fortitude Valley, Nadia Javed
26-28 July 2019	The Orielles, Bis, Tracyanne & Danny, Kero Kero Bonito, Martha, The Spook School, Desperate Journalist, Big Joanie, Stealing Sheep, Withered Hand, Advance Base, Adult Mom, Peaness, Fresh, Cheerbleederz, Mammoth Penguins, Witching Waves
27-29 July 2018	British Sea Power, Honeyblood, The Lovely Eggs, Dream Wife, Girl Ray, Sacred Paws, Darren Hayman, Even As We Speak, Haiku Salut, Amber Arcades, Boyracer, Gwenno, Happy Accidents, Wolf Girl, The Smittens, GHUM, Whitelands
28-30 July 2017	The Wedding Present, Cate Le Bon, Martha, Joanna Gruesome, Shopping, Monkey Swallows the Universe, The Tuts, The Hearing, The Wave Pictures, Grace Petrie, The Hayman Kupa Band, Personal Best, Peaness, The Orchids, Kid Canaveral, Chorusgirl
29–31 July 2016	Saint Etienne, The Aislers Set, The Spook School, Emma Pollock, Darren Hayman and the Secondary Modern, The Lovely Eggs, Comet Gain, PO!, Red Sleeping Beauty, White Town, Haiku Salut
24–26 July 2015	The Go! Team, Cinerama, The Pains Of Being Pure At Heart, Colleen Green, Martha, Euros Childs, Lætitia Sadier, The Wave Pictures, Desperate Journalist, The Ethical Debating Society, Steven James Adams, The Darling Buds, Chorusgirl
25–27 July 2014	Gruff Rhys, Allo Darlin', The Hidden Cameras, Dean Wareham, Joanna Gruesome, Withered Hand, The Chills, Spearmint, The Popguns, Sweet Baboo, The Spook School, The Just Joans, The Manhattan Love Suicides, Big Joanie, Wolf Girl
26–28 July 2013	Camera Obscura, The Pastels, Still Corners, Helen Love, The Wave Pictures, Bis, The Brilliant Corners, The Tuts, The Ballet, The Lovely Eggs, Haiku Salut, Milky Wimpshake, The Wake, Tunabunny
6–8 July 2012	The Vaselines, Veronica Falls, Allo Darlin', Darren Hayman and the Secondary Modern, Stevie Jackson, Summer Camp, The Monochrome Set, White Town, Go Sailor, The June Brides, The Jasmine Minks, The Smittens
20–31 July 2011	Edwyn Collins, The Hidden Cameras, Herman Dune, Crystal Stilts, Jeffrey Lewis & The Junkyard, Suburban Kids With Biblical Names, Jonny, Withered Hand, Math and Physics Club, Help Stamp Out Loneliness
23–25 July 2010	The Pains Of Being Pure At Heart, The Primitives, Slow Club, Ballboy, The Pooh Sticks, Tender Trap, White Town, Everybody Was In The French Resistance... Now!, Allo Darlin', Betty and The Werewolves, The Smittens, The Hillfields
24–26 July 2009	Teenage Fanclub, Camera Obscura, La Casa Azul, Art Brut, Au Revoir Simone, Emmy The Great, Rose Elinor Dougall, The Manhattan Love Suicides, BMX Bandits, Lucky Soul, The Frank & Walters, The Smittens
26–27 July 2008	The Wedding Present, Los Campesinos!, Comet Gain, Ballboy, The Wave Pictures, Darren Hayman, Harvey Williams, The Smittens, The Deirdres, Darren Hanlon, Shrag
28–29 July 2007	Darren Hayman & The Secondary Modern, The Orchids, The Indelicates, The School, Bearsuit, Cats On Fire, The Bobby McGees, The Lovely Eggs, The Loves, Wake The President
28 April 2007	Pocketbooks, Slow Down Tallahassee, Tottie
