= The Blanche Hudson Weekend =

- Origin: Leeds, West Yorkshire, United Kingdom
- Genres: Alternative rock, indie rock
- Years active: 2009–present
- Labels: Squirrel Records (UK), Odd Box Records (UK)
- Members: Caroline McChrystal; Darren Lockwood; Chris Shake; Lee Hooper; Sasha Delirium
- Website: Official website

The Blanche Hudson Weekend is a UK-based indie band, originating from Leeds and formed in 2009. The band is named after the fictional character portrayed by Joan Crawford in the 1962 film What Ever Happened to Baby Jane?, which itself is based on the Henry Farrell novel of the same name. The band was formed by Darren Lockwood and Caroline McChrystal after the split of their former band The Manhattan Love Suicides in July 2009. AllMusic's Margaret Reges described the band as "[...] a twee pop outfit whose blissfully buzzy, girl group-influenced tunes drew heavily from seminal twee pop acts like the Shop Assistants, Dolly Mixture, and Talulah Gosh", and the band have cited the British indie pop band The Primitives as an influence.

Initially the band were a studio-only project with various guests helping on recordings. They released their debut 7", an EP titled The Letters to Daddy, on Squirrel Records in November 2009. On 20 July 2010 the band debuted its live line-up for the first time. The band then released two further 7" singles, followed by a 17-track compilation CD, released on the band's own Squirrel Records imprint at the end of 2010, titled Reverence, Severance and Spite. The band's debut album, titled You Always Loved Violence, was released on 10 October 2011. The three-track limited edition Deep Thrust EP was released on Odd Box Records on 12 November 2012 as a prelude to a new album to be entitled How Many Times Have You Let Me Die?, scheduled for release on 8 April 2013.
