= Chorusgirl =

Musical group

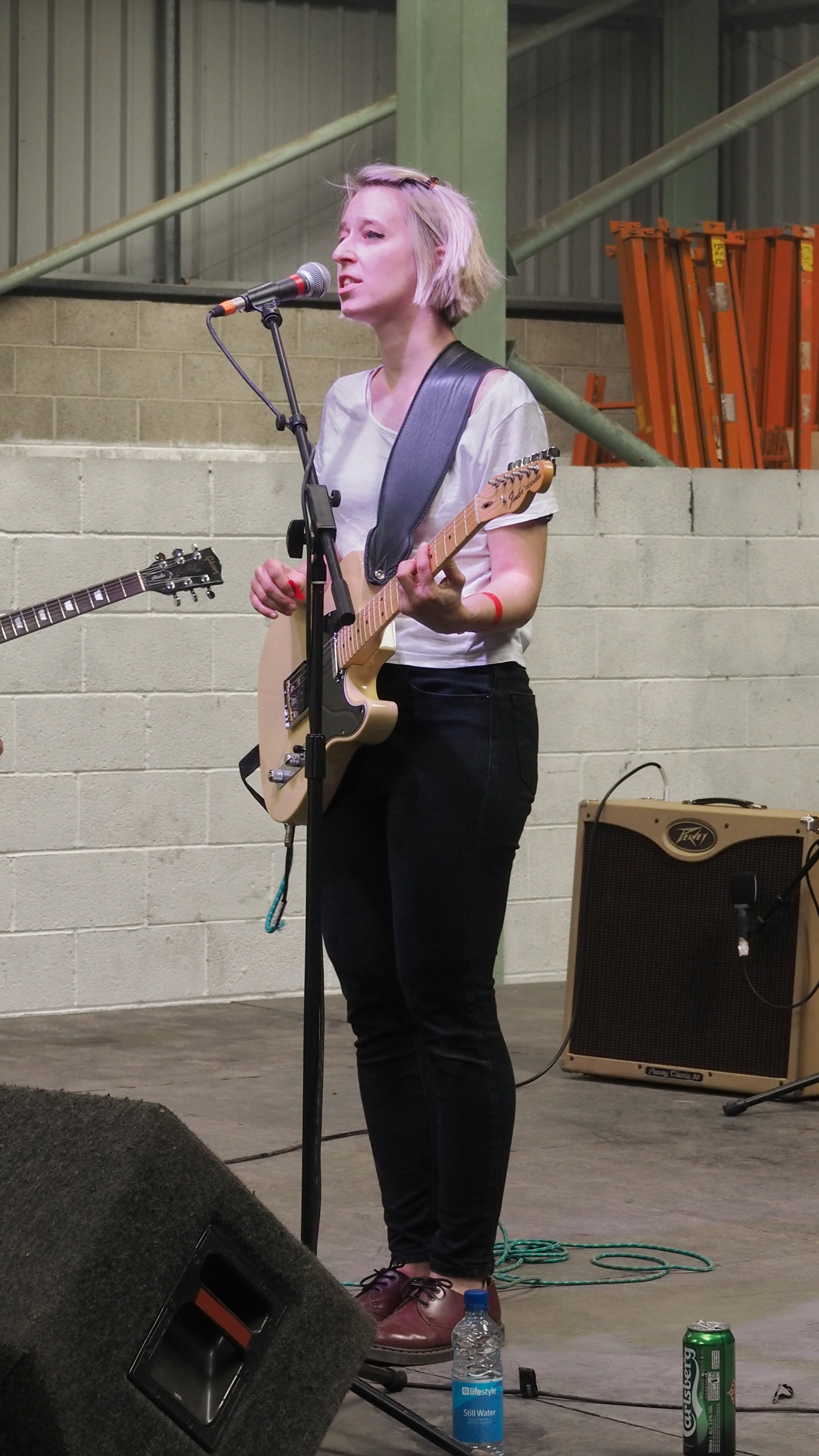

Background information
- Origin: London, England
- Genre: Indie pop
- Labels: Fortuna Pop! Reckless Yes
- Spinoff of: Mikrofisch
- Members: Silvi Wersing; Udo Westhoff
- Past members: Caroline Arvensis; Diogo Oliveira; Faith Taylor; Michael Boyle

Chorusgirl is the musical project of Silvi Wersing formed in 2014. The band have released three albums on independent record labels; Chorusgirl (2015), Shimmer And Spin (2018), and Colapso Calypso (2022).

== History ==
Silvi Wersing spent her formative years as a musician playing bass and guitar in a string of bands, first in Germany, then in England, before striking out on her own under the name Chorusgirl in 2014. The songs mixed influences from the 1980s and 1990s (the Cure, Lush) with more recent bands of a similar vein (Vivian Girls, Dum Dum Girls).

Wersing began recording demos on her own, and later with producer Jan-Niklas Jansen, at Bear Cave Studio in Cologne. When enough songs were ready to be aired live, she formed a group. Bassist Udo Westhoff, drummer Michael Boyle, and guitarist Caroline Arvensis joined in 2014. Though Arvensis was soon replaced by Diogo Oliveira, and he was later still replaced by Faith Taylor.

The group released a single "No Moon"/"Dream on, Baby Blue" for the Odd Box Records' 100 Club series in early 2015, then later that year released their self-titled debut album on Fortuna Pop!.

The band played Indietracks festival in both 2015 and 2017.

On 11 September 2018 the band announced their second album with lead single "No Goodbyes". The album, entitled Shimmer And Spin, was released by Reckless Yes on 16 November.

== Discography ==
=== Album ===
- Chorusgirl - Fortuna Pop!, 12" LP, CD, MP3 (2015)
- Shimmer And Spin - Reckless Yes, 12" LP, CD, MP3 (2018)
- Colapso Calypso - Reckless Yes, 12" LP, CD, MP3 (2022)

=== Singles ===
- "No Moon" / "Dream on, Baby Blue" - Odd Box Records, 7" LP, CD, MP3 (2015)
