= Spook School (disambiguation) =

Spook School is a nickname given to the Glasgow School from the 1890s to sometime around 1910.

Spook School or The Spook School may also refer to:

- Glasgow School, artists.
- The Spook School, band.
