= Theoretical Girl =

Singer

- Origin: Southend-on-Sea, England
- Genres: Alternative rock, indie pop, post-punk, new wave
- Years active: 2004–present
- Labels: Memphis Industries, Soft Power Records
- Members: Amy Turnnidge

Theoretical Girl (Amy Turnnidge) is a female songwriter and multi-instrumentalist from Southend-on-Sea signed to the Memphis Industries record label. On her Myspace page, she describes her music as "Electro / Folk / Classical".

== Discography ==
=== Albums ===
- Divided – Memphis Industries, CD, MP3 (2009) / Soft Power Records, 12" LP, MP3 (2010)

All tracks are written by Amy Turnnidge.

No.	Title	Length
1.	"Rivals"	3:09
2.	"The Boy I Left Behind"	3:23
3.	"Dancehall Deceit"	2:19
4.	"I Should Have Loved You More"	3:16
5.	"A Future Apart"	3:51
6.	"Divided"	3:43
7.	"Red Mist"	3:20
8.	"Never Good Enough"	3:22
9.	"Good Timing"	3:36
10.	"The Biggest Mistake"	2:40
11.	"Seeing You Again"	2:32
12.	"The Hypocrite"	2:53

=== Singles ===
- "It's All Too Much" – Fake Product (2006)
- "Red Mist" – Half Machine Records (2007)
- "The Hypocrite" – Salvia/XL Recordings (2008)
- "Another Fight" – Salvia/XL Recordings (2008)
- "Nursery Academy" – Split single on Pure Groove (2008)
- "Rivals" – Memphis Industries (2009)
- "Red Mist" – Memphis Industries (2009)

== Performances ==
Theoretical Girl has gigged throughout Europe, the US and Asia over the past three years either with just her guitar and backing tracks or backed by her band "The Equations", whose members went on to join bands such as Ipso Facto and Yassassin. Bands she has played with include Robyn, Maxïmo Park, Kate Nash, Lethal Bizzle, Calvin Harris, Good Shoes, and Metric.

She received a 4/5 review by The Guardian for her live performance. Theoretical Girl appeared at the 2009 Glastonbury festival and SXSW. She also toured Asia, playing Tokyo and Hong Kong.

== Awards ==
In 2009, Theoretical Girl was awarded a grant by the PRS Foundation and invited to perform at their showcase at the SXSW Festival in Austin, Texas.
