= The Spook School =

British four-piece indie pop band

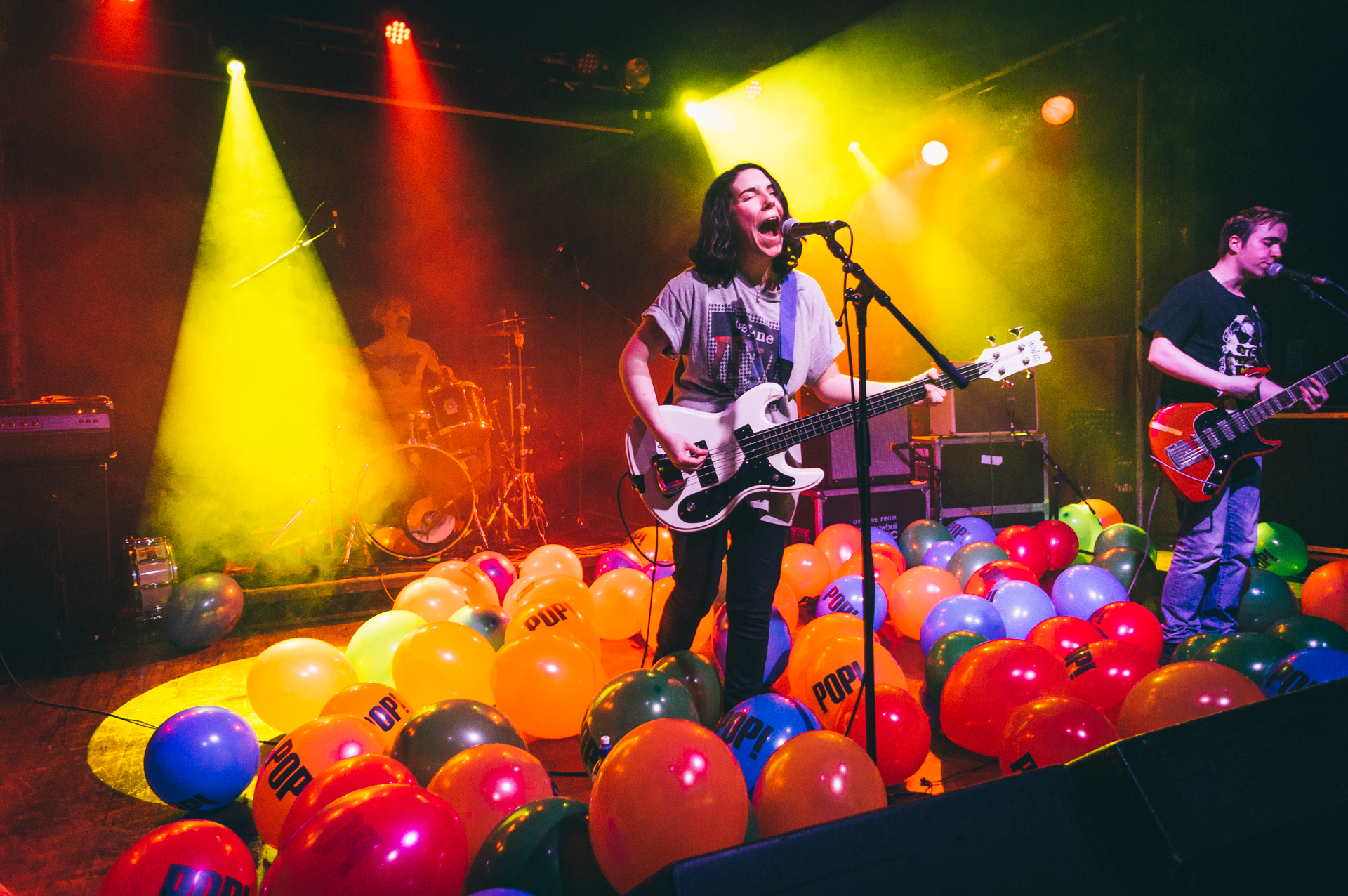
- The Spook School in 2017

Background information
- Origin: Edinburgh, Scotland
- Genres: Indie pop; Pop punk; Queercore
- Years active: 2011–2019, 2026–present
- Labels: Fortuna Pop!; Slumberland Records; Alcopop! Records
- Members: Nye Todd; Adam Todd; AC Cory; Niall McCamley
- Website: thespookschool.com

The Spook School are a British four-piece indie pop band from Edinburgh, Scotland. They released three albums on independent record labels; Dress Up (2013), Try to Be Hopeful (2015), and Could It Be Different? (2018) before disbanding in 2019 - they announced a reformation in August 2026 alongside a fourth album - Like A Heartbeat - which will release in January 2027.

== History ==
They met and formed in 2011 whilst attending the University of Edinburgh. Brothers Nye and Adam Todd met AC Cory and Niall McCamley through the university's comedy society. Most of the band have previously been involved in live comedy shows, some of which were performed at the Edinburgh Festival Fringe. The band first rehearsed in the basement of the Forest Café and would get told off for being too noisy by poetry nights trying to perform upstairs. They named themselves in reference to a nickname of the Glasgow School.Their first show was at Henry's Cellar Bar in Edinburgh.

After a self released CD-R single, "History" / "Hallam", they released an EP (recorded in Adam Todd's bedroom) on cassette with Scottish label Soft Power Records in 2012 with the title I Don't Know, You Don't Know, We All Don't Know the Spook School. It was followed by a single for Cloudberry Records later that year.

Fortuna Pop! label owner Sean Price signed the band after seeing them play at Indietracks Festival in 2012. They released music on the label until its dissolution in 2017, shortly after which they signed to Alcopop! Records.

They released their first album, Dress Up, in 2013. In 2014 they played N.Y.C. Popfest. That same year, the band were invited to do the music for the second season of the BBC Three show Badults.

Try to Be Hopeful was issued in October 2015, again by the Fortuna Pop! label, as well as Slumberland Records in the U.S. The group's next appearance on record was Continental Drift, a split LP on Fortuna Pop! and Slumberland that also featured songs by the Mercury Girls, Wildhoney, and Tigercats.

After the 2017 holiday single "Someone to Spend Christmas With" on their new UK label, Alcopop! Records, in early 2018 the Spook School released with third album, Could It Be Different?.

The band announced that they were breaking up in March 2019, and went on a farewell tour later in the year. In a statement, they said "we just can't devote ourselves to the band the way we want to anymore" and that they would "rather go out with a fanfare" than "slip away". Their last show was at The Art School in Glasgow.

On 22 May 2023 The Spook School announced two live performances would happen, one in Glasgow on 8 December and one in London on 16 December, to mark the 10 year anniversary of the release of their debut album.

On 23 August 2026, the band surprise-released a single called Falling, later that day posting a Facebook post announcing a new album to be released the next January alongside pre-orders, and some live performances.

== Musical style ==
Their music is often compared to bands on the C86 compilation, such as The Shop Assistants, as well as The Buzzcocks; the band also lists David Bowie as an influence.

The band's lyrics explore "gender, sexuality and queer issues" with themes such as "fluidity and the lack of a binary in gender".

== Critical reception ==
Their debut album, released in 2013, is entitled Dress Up because it "relates to the idea of gender being a social construction, something that can be artificially appropriated". The record received positive reviews from Loud and Quiet, Under the Radar, and The Skinny.

Their second album, Try to Be Hopeful, released in 2015, has also received favourable coverage from music journalists. Often with emphasis that their world-view encompasses the fluidity of both gender and sexuality and that this gives their output "urgency and cheering freshness".

The band's third album, Could It Be Different? was released January 2018 - just before embarking on a US tour supporting New York state pop-punk duo Diet Cig. It has been described as a "defining statement", and a "a life-affirming return" which finds them "on the cusp of greatness". Clash called it arguably "one of the most important albums of 2018". It was long-listed for that years Scottish Album of the Year Award.

== Other projects ==
Niall McCamley also leads a band called Squiggles. AC Cory was in London based trio The Whooperups, along with Healey Becks of Wolf Girl and Fightmilk and Camille Fry of Charla Fantasma. Cory is now in the Glasgow based band Picture Round. Adam Todd is now in a synth-pop duo called Get Wrong with Naomi Griffin of County Durham punk band Martha.

== Discography ==
=== Albums ===
- Dress Up - Fortuna Pop!, 12" LP, CD, MP3 (2013)
- Try to Be Hopeful - Fortuna Pop!, 12" LP, CD, MP3 (2015)
- Could It Be Different? - Alcopop! Records (UK) / Slumberland Records (US), 12" LP, CD, MP3 (2018)
- Like a Heartbeat - Alcopop! Records (UK) / Slumberland Records (US), (2027)

=== Extended plays ===
- I Don't Know, You Don't Know, We All Don't Know the Spook School - Soft Power Records, Cassette EP, MP3 (2012)

=== Singles ===
- "History" / "Hallam" - Self release, CD Single, MP3 (2011)
- "Here We Go" / "Cameraman" - Cloudberry Records, 7" Single, MP3 (2012)
- "I'll Be Honest" / "Will You Always Be My Friend?" - Fortuna Pop!, 7" Single, MP3 (2013)
- "Binary" / "David Bowie Songs" - Fortuna Pop!, 7" Single, MP3 (2016)
- "Someone to Spend Christmas With" - Alcopop! Records, MP3 (2017)
- "Still Alive" - Alcopop! Records, MP3 (2017)
- "Less Than Perfect" - Alcopop! Records, MP3 (2017)
- "Body" - Alcopop! Records, MP3 (2018)
- "Keep in Touch" - Alcopop! Records, MP3 (2019)
- "Falling" - Alcopop! Records, (2026)

=== Split releases ===
- Continental Drift (with Tigercats, Wildhoney, and Mercury Girls) - Fortuna Pop! and Slumberland Records, 12" EP, MP3 (2016)
