= Odd Box Records =

- Founded: 2009
- Defunct: 2019
- Genre: Indie pop, indie rock
- Country of origin: United Kingdom
- Location: Cardiff
- Official website: https://oddboxrecords.bandcamp.com/

Odd Box Records was a British DIY indiepop record label founded in London. In 2016 it was relocated to Cardiff, Wales. It was hailed as a "big presence on the indiepop scene."

== History ==
Odd Box was launched in 2009, after the dissolution of earlier imprint Lost Music Records. The label has issued a steady and wide-ranging series of albums, EPs and singles since that time including well-received releases by The Wolfhounds, Pocketbooks, Sarandon, The Manhattan Love Suicides, Martha, Joanna Gruesome, The Blanche Hudson Weekend and The Ethical Debating Society, as well as other groups such as The Millipedes, The Humms, The Wednesday Club, One Happy Island, The Monorals, The Smittens, Ace Bushy Striptease, Pale Man Made, Tyrannosaurus Dead, Wolf Girl and Giant Burger.

In 2017 Odd Box released the first in a planned series of EPs by The Darling Buds, featuring their first new material for 25 years, and reissued the debut album by Witching Waves, originally released on Soft Power Records. The label ended in 2019.

== Odd Box album artists ==
- Ace Bushy Striptease
- Anguish Sandwich
- The Blanche Hudson Weekend
- City Yelps
- Corporationpop
- The Ethical Debating Society
- Frozy
- Giant Burger
- The Humms
- The Manhattan Love Suicides
- The Millipedes
- The Monorals
- Nervous Twitch
- One Happy Island
- Pale Man Made
- Pocketbooks
- Rainbow Reservoir
- The Rosie Taylor Project
- Sarandon
- Silent Forum
- The Smittens
- Suggested Friends
- T.O.Y.S.
- T-Shirt Weather
- Two White Cranes
- Tyrannosaurus Dead
- The Wednesday Club
- The Wendy Darlings
- Witching Waves
- Wolf Girl
- The Wolfhounds
- Year Of Birds
