= Could It Be Different? =

Studio album by the Spook School
- Released: 26 January 2018
- Studios: Suburban Home, Leeds
- Length: 33:31
- Labels: Fortuna Pop! (UK); Slumberland Records (US)
- Producer: Matthew 'MJ' Johnson

The Spook School chronology
Try to Be Hopeful (2015)	Could It Be Different? (2018)	Like a Heartbeat (2027)

Professional ratings
Aggregate scores
Source	Rating
Metacritic	79/100
Review scores
Source	Rating
AllMusic	4/5 stars
Clash	9/10
Drowned in Sound	8/10
The Line of Best Fit	7.2/10.0
The Skinny	4/5 stars

Could It Be Different? is the third and final studio album by Scottish band the Spook School. It was released in January 2018 by Fortuna Pop! in the UK/EU and Slumberland Records in the US.

Clash called it "arguably [...] one of the most important albums of 2018". It was long-listed for that years Scottish Album of the Year Award.

Opener Still Alive begins with a clip of English comedian Josie Long taken from her show Romance and Adventure.

"If this government is grinding you down, or making you feel hopeless or beaten or anything like that, don’t let them do that to you, because seriously… fuck them."

== Critical reception ==
Could It Be Different? was met with "generally favorable" reviews from critics. At Metacritic, which assigns a weighted average rating out of 100 to reviews from mainstream publications, this release received an average score of 79, based on 11 reviews. Aggregator Album of the Year gave the release a 79 out of 100 based on a critical consensus of 13 reviews.

== Track listing ==
No.	Title	Length
1.	"Still Alive"	3:13
2.	"Best of Intentions"	1:56
3.	"Less Than Perfect"	2:51
4.	"Keep In Touch"	3:37
5.	"Bad Year"	3:51
6.	"Alright (Sometimes)"	3:03
7.	"I Only Dance When I Want To"	2:48
8.	"I Hope She Loves You"	2:11
9.	"While You Were Sleeping"	2:44
10.	"Body"	3:19
11.	"High School"	3:58
