= September Girls =

Irish noise pop band

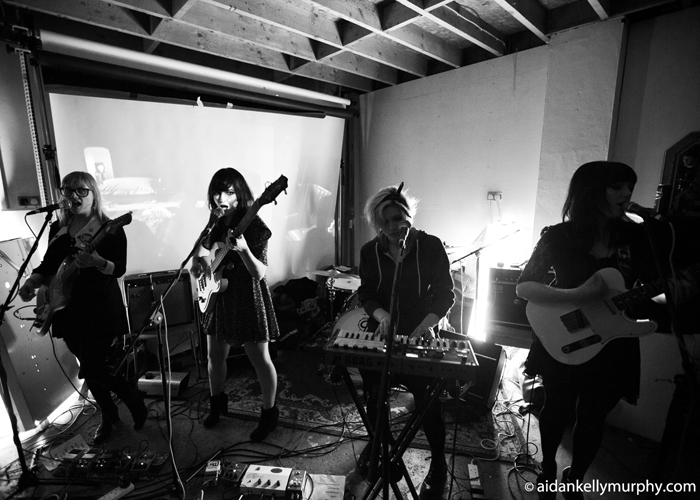
- September Girls

Background information
- Origin: Dublin, Ireland
- Genres: Noise pop
- Years active: 2011–2016
- Labels: Fortuna Pop!, Kanine Records, Vinyl Junkie, Soft Power Records, Matinée Recordings, Art For Blind
- Members: Paula Cullen; Caoimhe Derwin; Lauren Kerchner; Jessie Ward; Sarah Grimes
- Website: septembergirls.tumblr.com

September Girls were a five-piece noise pop band from Dublin, Ireland. The band formed in September 2011 and performed their first gig in Dublin in November 2011. Having released singles under various labels between 2012 and 2013, the band signed to Fortuna Pop! in 2013 and released their debut album in January 2014.

In Autumn 2014, ahead of their appearance at the CMJ Music Marathon in New York, the band announced signing to Kanine Records, and an EP release through Kanine & Fortuna Pop!

== History ==
=== Formation, early years (2011–2013) ===
September Girls formed following the break up of their previous band Talulah Does The Hula in September 2011, adding drummer Sarah Grimes to the band. The group took their name from the Big Star song 'September Gurls'.

The change in name also resulted in a change in sound from the group with the five-piece taking inspiration from the garage rock scene and bands the members were listening to at the time.

The group then began to perform live around the Irish and UK music scenes and would eventually release several stand alone singles. This included limited edition 7" vinyls such as 'Green Eyed' in 2012 and a Cassette Store Day 2013 release of 'Ships' through Manchester noise pop band PINS record label Haus of Pins. Both songs would end up featuring on their debut album.

=== Debut album Cursing the Sea and Veneer EP (2014–2015) ===
In January 2014 September Girls released their first studio album Cursing the Sea via independent record label Fortuna Pop!. The album featured the single 'Heartbeats' and was well received by critics upon its release; it holds a Metacritic score of 72. The group's tour in support of the album resulted in appearances at both the Body&Soul and SXSW festivals.

In the winter of 2014 the band would follow-up their debut record with the release of a four-track E.P. entitled Veneer through both Fortuna Pop! and Kanine Records. The record was compared favourably to Cursing the Sea and many critics regarding it as a marked improvement, with Lisa Wright of NME writing that "Where September Girls' debut earmarked them as the latest addition to the Dum Dum Girls/Vivian Girls school of Phil Spector worship, 'Veneer' finds the Irish quintet throwing off the '60s girl-group coyness in favour of something fiercer."

=== Second album Age of Indignation (2016–present) ===
September Girls released their second studio album Age of Indignation in April 2016 via Fortuna Pop!. The album was preceded with the single and video 'Love No One' Age of Indignation holds a Metacritic score of 69. The group did a brief US West Coast tour alongside several SXSW shows. The band played a series of album launches in Ireland in April 2016, before released a second single/video for "Jaw on the Floor", featuring backing vocals from A Place to Bury Strangers' Oliver Ackermann. They also played a brief UK tour in support of the album in May 2016.

== Members ==
- Paula Cullen – vocals, lead bass
- Caoimhe Derwin – vocals, rhythm guitar
- Lauren Kerchner – vocals, keys
- Jessie Ward – vocals, lead guitar
- Sarah Grimes – drums

== Discography ==
Studio albums

- Cursing the Sea (2014)
- Age of Indignation (2016)

EPs

- Veneer (2014)

Other releases

- "Wanting More" b/w "Secret Lovers" A limited 100-run cassette single released on 30 April 2012 by Soft Power Records. (SOFT008)
- "Green Eyed" b/w "Danny Wood" 7" released on 22 October 2012 by Soft Power Records. (SOFT009)
- "Wanting More" b/w "Hells Bells" & "Man Chats" 7" released on 6 November 2012 by Matinée Recordings. (MAT085)
- "Talking" b/w "Some For Me" 7" released on 10 April 2013 by Art for Blind Records. (AFB36)
- "Ships" b/w "Flesh" A limited 100-run cassette single released on Cassette Store Day, 7 September 2013 by Haus of Pins. (HOP006)
- "Heartbeats" b/w "Wasted" 7" released on 4 November 2013 by Fortuna POP! (FPOP160)
- "Big Itch Club" Split 7" with The #1s and Faux Kings, featuring a cover of the song "Gay Bar" released on 16 November 2013 by Bachelor Records. (BR-67)
