= The Tuts =

English DIY pop punk band

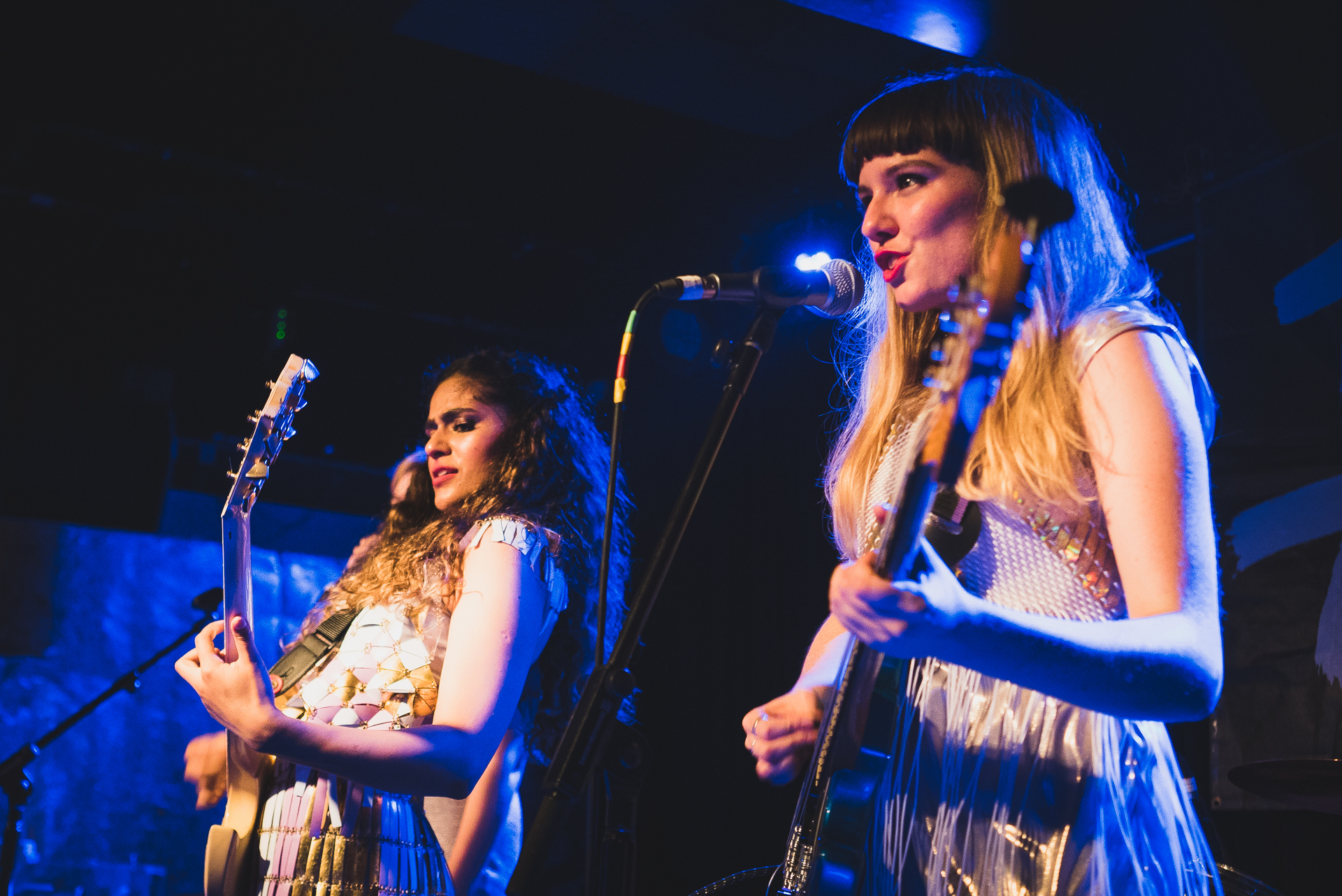
- Nadia Javed (left) and Harriet Doveton (right) performing in September 2016

Background information
- Origin: Hayes, Hillingdon, London, England
- Genres: Indie rock; pop punk; riot grrrl
- Years active: 2007–2019
- Label: Dovetown
- Past members: Nadia Javed; Beverley Ishmael; Harriet Doveton
- Website: thetuts.bandcamp.com

The Tuts were an English pop punk, "three-tone" band from Hayes, Greater London. They received extensive coverage from alternative music radio, most notably Amazing Radio, and from music websites such as Louder Than War which published multiple articles on the group, calling them "one of the UK's most exciting bands". The band, particularly frontwoman Nadia Javed, were the subject of a feature in the ITV series Young, British and Muslim in April 2018.

Initially influenced by contemporary indie and alternative rock, their back-to-basics sound and feminist politics led to comparisons with older genres such as punk, C86 and riot grrrl.

By 2022, Javed had become a solo artist.

== Origins ==
The Tuts were formed by teenagers Nadia Javed (guitar) and Beverley Ishmael (drums) in the mid-2000s while still at school. The bass guitarist, Harriet Doveton (also of Colour Me Wednesday), joined in late 2010 and this line up played its first gig in early 2011.

The band self-released their first EP, The Tuts, in 2012, and the download single "Tut Tut Tut" early the following year, picking up radio support from Billy Reeves, Gary Crowley, Ruth Barnes, Steve Lamacq and Gideon Coe.

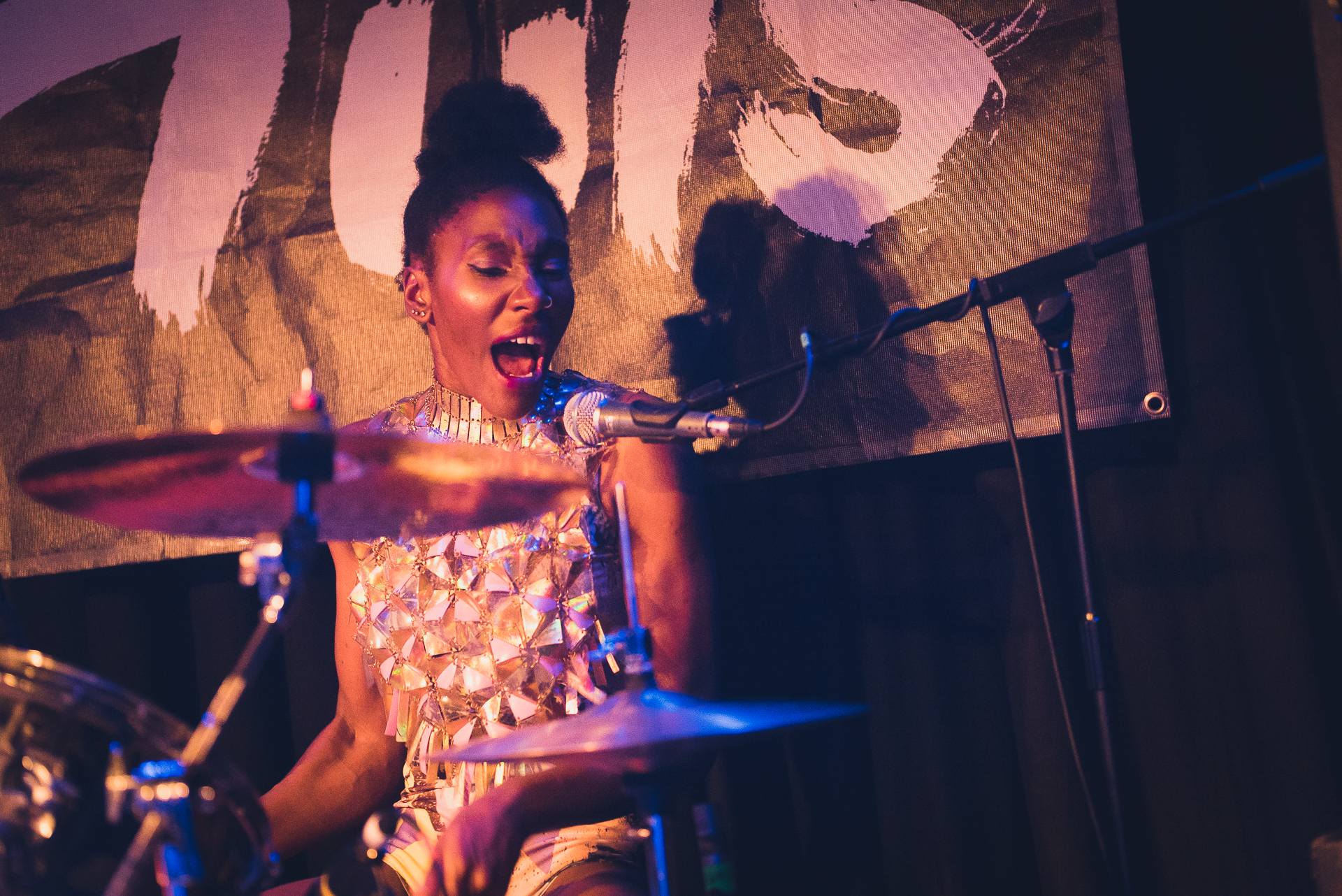
Bev of The Tuts in 2016

A 2013 tour with Kate Nash led to a track on Nash's Have Faith This Christmas EP later that year; the band also made their first appearance at Indietracks, and released two more download singles, "Dump Your Boyfriend" and "Worry Warrior", the artwork for the latter a playful nod to X Ray Spex.

In 2014, the band released a second EP, Time to Move On, and played on the Leftfield stage at Glastonbury Festival at the invitation of Billy Bragg.

In 2015, they launched the single "Do I Have to Look For Love?", toured with the Selecter and Sonic Boom Six, returned to Indietracks and appeared at the Tolpuddle Martyrs festival.

== Album and after ==
Having built a fanbase solely through touring and DIY/social media promotion, in spring 2016 the Tuts started a PledgeMusic campaign to finance their debut album. It reached its target within a week.

The band's album Update Your Brain was released in September 2016 to universally-positive reviews, including national press.

In July, they released a new download single, "Let Go of the Past", with an accompanying video. Their video to follow-up single "1982" was premiered on Vice magazine's Noisey channel in October 2016.

In September 2016, they embarked on an album release tour, including a sold out show at The Lexington, London, and a run of dates co-headlining with anti-folk Manchester based band Crywank. The same year the band played with the Undertones, Thee Faction, Adam Ant and Senseless Things and performed at several summer festivals in 2016, including Bearded Theory, Glastonwick, Camden Rocks, Indiefjord, Godiva and Rebellion. In 2017 the Tuts supported Feeder, toured with the Skints, and played the Bestival and Indietracks festivals.

In May and June 2017, the Tuts embarked on their own "Give Us Something Worth Voting For" tour, with reference to the impending UK general election and their eponymous anti-Conservative album track. Later the same year the band collaborated with Girli on a new version of the song "Mr 10pm Bedtime", previously released on her Hot Mess EP.

Javed and the band received TV coverage as part of the ITV series Young British and Muslim in April 2018. The feature contained interview footage of Javed on life as a young female Muslim musician in Britain as well as rehearsal footage of the full band.

In March 2019, the band announced that they would be supporting the Specials on their Encore tour.

In June 2019, the Tuts supported Bikini Kill at O2 Academy Brixton alongside Big Joanie

In December 2019 Javed launched a live version of her song "I Hate Boris" on YouTube ahead of the general election.

In 2020 the band's debut album Update Your Brain featured in James Acaster's book and (with comedian Suzi Ruffell) podcast Perfect Sound, Whatever as one of his favourite albums of 2016.

== Breakup ==
After a lengthy silence from the band, Javed re-emerged as a solo artist in 2022, playing the Godiva Festival.

== Controversies ==
In January 2019, The Tuts said they had turned down the opportunity to represent the UK at the Eurovision Song Contest 2019 due to it being held in Israel. The band was not mentioned in the shortlist for the preliminary contest for UK entry, Eurovision: You Decide, which preceded the competition in February.

In July 2019, it emerged that Javed is one of several musicians being sued by the singer/rapper Jonny "Itch" Fox, seeking aggravated damages and an injunction for alleged libel. The defendants were fundraising towards their legal costs.

== Members ==
- Nadia Javed – guitar, vocals (2007-2019)
- Beverley Ishmael – drums (2007–2019)
- Harriet Doveton – bass, vocals (2010–2019)

== Discography ==
=== Album ===
- Update Your Brain Dovetown, LP/CD/DD, 2016

=== Singles/EPs ===
- The Tuts EP CD/DD, 2012
- "Tut Tut Tut" DD, 2013
- "Dump Your Boyfriend" DD, 2013
- "Worry Warrior" DD, 2013
- "Christmas Is In The Air" DD, 2013
- Time to Move On EP CD/DD, 2014
- "Do I Have To Look For Love" DD, 2015
- "Let Go of the Past" DD, 2016
- "1982" DD, 2016
- "Do I Have To Look For Love"/"Lying Lover" 7"/DD, 2017
- "Mr 10pm Bedtime" (Girli vs. The Tuts) DD, 2017

=== Compilation appearances ===
- "I Call You Up" on MC12, HHBTM Records, Cassette, 2012
- "Do I Have To Look For Love" on Don't Be Left Without Us, 2CD, 2016
