= Veneer (EP) =

Veneer E.P.

EP by September Girls
- Released: November 24, 2014
- Genre: Noise-Pop, Garage rock, Garage pop, Post punk
- Length: 14:15
- Label: Fortuna Pop! & Kanine Records

September Girls chronology
Cursing the Sea (2014)	Veneer E.P. (2014)

Professional ratings
Review scores
Source	Rating
NME	8/10 stars
AllMusic	3.5/5 stars
The Last Mixed Tape	9/10 stars
The Skinny (magazine)	4/5 stars
The Line of Best Fit	7/10 stars

Veneer is a four-track extended play by Irish noise pop band September Girls. The E.P. was recorded at Guerilla Studios in Dublin and released on November 24, 2014, via Fortuna Pop! (EU) and Kanine Records (US), 11 months after the release of their debut album Cursing the Sea.

== Track list ==
No.	Title	Length
1.	"Veneer"	2:58
2.	"Black Oil"	3:03
3.	"Melatonin"	3:38
4.	"Butterflies"	4:36

== Recording and Release ==
September Girls recorded Veneer following the release of September Girls first album Cursing the Sea at Guerilla Studios in Dublin. The first single to be taken from the record was the title-track which came out on October 13, accompanied by a music video directed by band member Jessie Ward. This was quickly followed by the second single 'Black Oil'. Veneer was eventually released on November 24, 2015, on record labels Fortuna Pop! and Kanine Records.

== Critical reception ==
Veneer was well received by critics upon it release, with many reviewers comparing it favorably to the band's debut album Cursing the Sea. Lisa Wright of NME stated "Where September Girls' debut earmarked them as the latest addition to the Dum Dum Girls/Vivian Girls school of Phil Spector worship, 'Veneer' finds the Irish quintet throwing off the '60s girl-group coyness in favour of something fiercer." While Chris Buckle of The Skinny (magazine) said "Eleven months after debut album Cursing the Sea established a September Girls-sound hewn from heavy reverb, fuzzy melodies and a moody noir complexion, Veneer steers the Dublin quintet into marginally darker and more turbulent waters."

The E.P also received positive reviews from the group's native city with Irish music critic Stephen White of The Last Mixed Tape stating that "September Girls are a band defined by their individuality and commitment to never staying in the same spot sonically or stylistically. Veneer showcases this essential central characteristic." Local culture magazine In Dublin referred to the E.P. as "a sure sign of a promising future for the Dublin band".

== Personnel ==
=== September Girls ===
- Paula Cullen - Vocals, Lead Bass
- Caoimhe Derwin - Vocals, Rhythm Guitar
- Lauren Kerchner - Vocals, Keys
- Jessie Ward - Vocals, Lead Guitar
- Sarah Grimes - Drums

=== Technical personnel ===
- Recorded and Mixed by John Murphy
- Mastered by Harvey Birrell
