= Pocketbooks =

British indiepop band

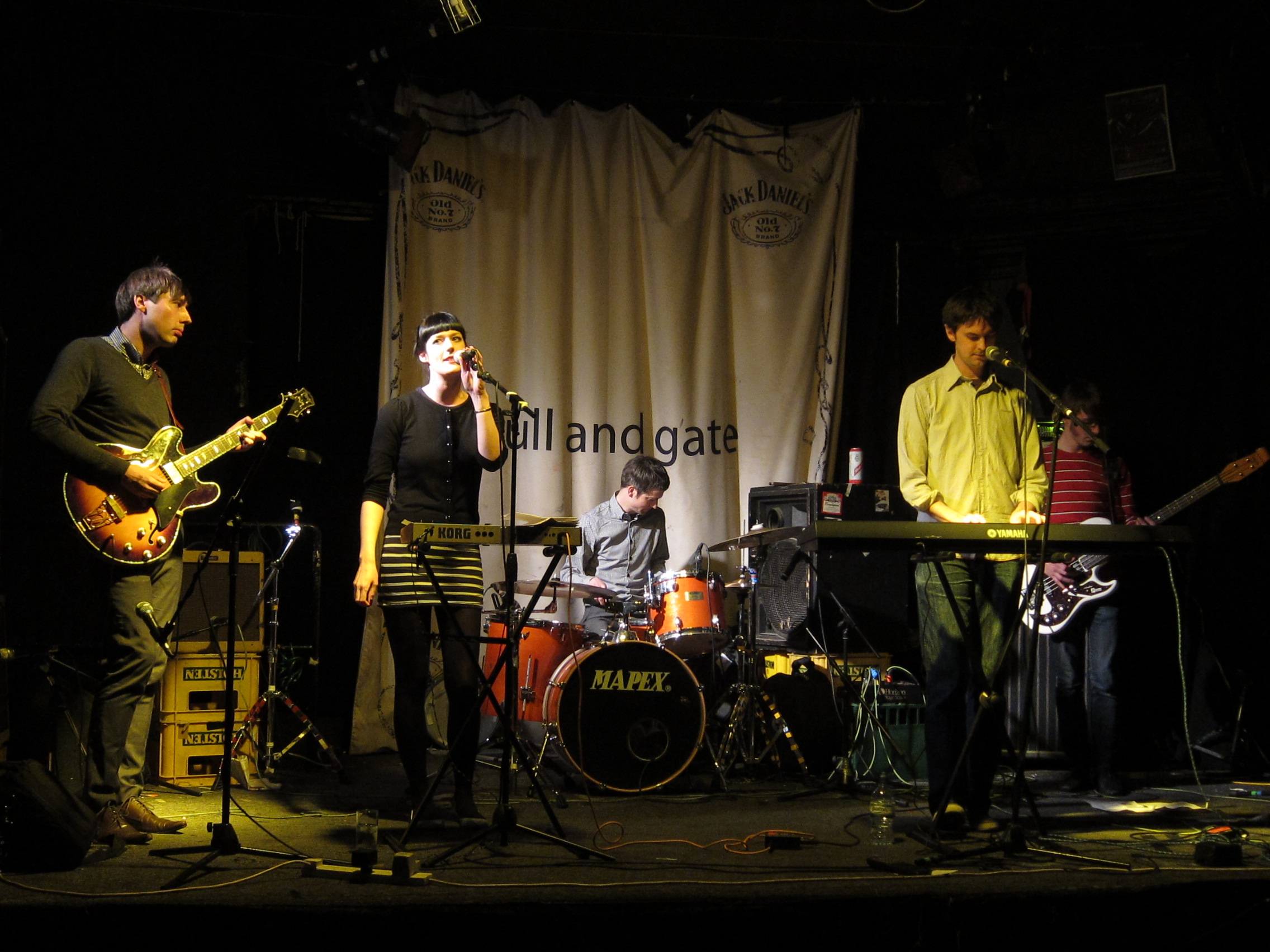
Pocketbooks in 2010.

Pocketbooks was an indiepop band formed in London in 2006. Their music combined melodic boy/girl harmonies, spiralling guitars and delicate piano lines with a dash of 60s soul.

The band first introduced themselves to the world by appearing on the 2006 compilation The Kids At The Club, released on How Does It Feel To Be Loved?, alongside indiepop favourites such as Suburban Kids With Biblical Names, Tender Trap, I’m From Barcelona and Voxtrot.

As well as playing gigs across the UK, Europe and the USA, they headlined the first ever Indietracks event on a steam railway in April 2007 which later turned into the annual Indietracks Festival which several members of the band helped to organise. They have played shows with The Pains Of Being Pure At Heart, Camera Obscura, God Help The Girl, Art Brut, The Wedding Present, and Darren Hayman, as well as festivals such as Offset Festival, New York Popfest, San Francisco Popfest, London Popfest, Indiepop Days in Germany and Rip It Up! in Sweden. In 2009 they played a Rough Trade in-store event to celebrate their inclusion on the Rough Trade Indiepop 09 compilation alongside 2009 favourites Vivian Girls, Los Campesinos! and Dum Dum Girls.

Their debut single Cross The Line, released on Atomic Beat Records in 2007, was described by poet and novelist Simon Armitage as “pure snowshaker pop, and more dressing table than kitchen sink”. This was followed by an EP, Waking Up, released on Make Do And Mend Records in 2008. Their debut album, Flight Paths, was released on 13 July 2009 on How Does It Feel To Be Loved?. This was preceded by a single, "Footsteps", on 15 June 2009. Songs from the album picked up radio play from Huw Stephens (BBC Radio 1), Gideon Coe (BBC 6 Music) and John Kennedy (Xfm). In 2009, music critic Everett True said of the album “I know what I like, and I like this.”

The band's second album Carousel was released in September 2011 on Odd Box Records.

== History ==
The band was formed in 2006 by Andy Hudson, who had previously been writing and recording as a solo artist under the Pocketbooks name. The original line-up included Andy Hudson on vocals and piano, Benjamin Dorning on guitar, Mark Reston on bass guitar, Emma Hall on keyboard and backing vocals, and Daniel Chapman on drums.

Benjamin played his final gig with the band in April 2007, after which the remaining members went through a role change, moving Mark onto guitar and Daniel onto bass guitar. Jonny Tansey then joined on drums in July 2007. Emma began to play a larger role on vocals as Andy’s song writing leaned more towards the boy/girl harmonies the band have become known for.

Mark played his final gig with the band in September 2007 and was replaced by Ian Cowen on guitar, who played his first gig the following month. This completed the line-up.

In 2012, after playing their largest gig to date at Auditorio Municipal Parque Fofó in Murcia, Spain, Pocketbooks decided to take an extended break to concentrate on their other musical projects.

Emma Hall now sings in The Fireworks. Daniel Chapman currently plays bass guitar in Cosines, writes and records solo material as Hot Booth and previously played in The Loves and One Fathom Down. Ian Cowen also plays bass guitar in The Sunny Street, Electrophönvintage, The Understudies, and previously The Cut-Outs. Jonny Tansey previously played drums in The Loves, Electrophönvintage and One Fathom Down.

Andy, Emma and Ian are all involved in the running of the Indietracks Festival.

== Discography ==
=== Singles/EPs ===
- "Cross The Line"/ "Every Good Time We Ever Had" (7” vinyl, Atomic Beat Records, May 2007)
- "Waking Up"/"Falling Leaves"/"Love Is The Stick You Throw"/"Don’t Stop" (CD, Make Do And Mend Records, March 2008)
- "Footsteps" (download single, How Does It Feel To Be Loved?, June 2009)

=== Albums ===
- Flight Paths (How Does It Feel To Be Loved? (UK), Universal Records (Philippines), Happy Prince (Japan), July 2009)

Track listing: "Footsteps"/"Fleeting Moments"/"Camera Angles"/"The Outskirts Of Town"/"Cross The Line"/"Skating On Thin Ice"/"Sweetness And Light"/"I'm Not Going Out"/"Every Good Time We Ever Had"/"Paper Aeroplanes"/"All We Do Is Rush Around"

- Carousel (Odd Box Records (UK), 19 September 2011)

Track listing: "Fireworks At Midnight"/"Promises, Promises"/"The Sky At Night"/"Sound Of The Carnival"/"Sparklers"/"Gaumont State Cinema"/"Harbour Lights"/"The Flowers Are Still Standing"/"The Beaujolais Lanes"/"Five Day Forecast"/"The End Of The Pier"

=== Compilation appearances ===
- The Kids At The Club - an indiepop compilation (How Does It Feel To Be Loved?, 2006. Features the song "The First World Record")
- Public Service Broadcast Nine (Smalltown America, 2007. Features the song "Every Next Day Is A New Adventure")
- Summer’s Here (Eardrums Music, 2008. Features the song "Summertime")
- Series Two Records compilation volume 8 (Series Two Records, 2008. Features the song "Love Is The Stick You Throw")
- Indietracks Festival 2008 – an indiepop compilation (Make Do And Mend Records, 2008. Features the song "Falling Leaves")
- Life Has It In For Us, Volume 1 (A Layer Of Chips, 2009. Features the song "Summertime")
- Indietracks Festival 2009 – an indiepop compilation (Make Do And Mend Records, 2009. Features the song "Fleeting Moments")
- Piece Of Cake! – an indiepop compilation (Big Pink Cake, 2009. Features the song "Fleeting Moments")
- Rough Trade Indiepop 09 (Rough Trade, 2009. Features the song "Fleeting Moments")
