= Cursing the Sea =

Studio album by September Girls
- Released: 13 January 2014
- Genre: Noise pop, garage rock, jangle pop, post-punk
- Length: 37:41
- Label: Fortuna Pop!

September Girls chronology
Cursing the Sea (2014)	Veneer E.P. (2014)

Professional ratings
Aggregate scores
Source	Rating
Metacritic	72/100
Review scores
Source	Rating
AllMusic	3/5 stars
Clash (magazine)	7/10 stars
Drowned In Sound	7/10 stars
Hot Press	3/5 stars
MusicOMH	4/5 stars
NME	7/10 stars
PopMatters	7/10 stars

Cursing the Sea is the debut studio album by Irish pop band September Girls. It was released in the UK in January 2014 under Fortuna Pop!.

== Track list ==
No.	Title	Length
1.	"Cursing the Sea"	1:56
2.	"Another Love Song"	3:34
3.	"Left Behind"	3:27
4.	"Heartbeats"	2:47
5.	"Green Eyed"	2:54
6.	"Ships"	3:45
7.	"Talking"	2:29
8.	"Daylight"	3:00
9.	"Money"	2:59
10.	"Someone New"	2:23
11.	"Secret Lovers"	4:19
12.	"Sister"	4:08

== Critical reception ==
Cursing the Sea received positive reviews from critics. The album currently holds a score of 72 on review aggregator website Metacritic indicating "generally favorable reviews".

Noel Gardner, music critic with NME, described the album's sound as "bursting with the spirit of the Ramones circa ‘End Of The Century’ while also stating that "Caoimhe Derwin and Jessie Ward’s guitars have perfected that Jesus And Mary Chain kettle-whistle sound". Robin Murray of Clash (magazine) gave Cursing the Sea a 7 out of 10 score, describing the record as 'a thrilling ride that adds dangerous shades of noir to that jangle-pop format".

== Personnel ==
=== September Girls ===
- Paula Cullen - Vocals, Lead Bass
- Caoimhe Derwin - Vocals, Rhythm Guitar
- Lauren Kerchner - Vocals, Keys
- Jessie Ward - Vocals, Lead Guitar
- Sarah Grimes - Drums

=== Technical personnel ===
- Recorded by Robbie Brady and Séan Goucher
