= Try to Be Hopeful =

Studio album by the Spook School
- Released: 9 October 2015
- Studios: Suburban Home, Leeds; Soup Studio, London
- Genres: Indie pop; indie rock; noise pop
- Length: 33:41
- Label: Fortuna Pop!
- Producer: Matthew 'MJ' Johnson

The Spook School chronology
Dress Up (2013)	Try to Be Hopeful (2015)	Could It Be Different? (2018)

Professional ratings
Aggregate scores
Source	Rating
Metacritic	81/100
Review scores
Source	Rating
AllMusic	4/5 stars
Clash	8/10
Drowned in Sound	8/10
MusicOMH	4/5 stars
Pitchfork	7.2/10

Try to Be Hopeful is the second studio album by Scottish band the Spook School. It was released in October 2015 by Fortuna Pop!.

== Track listing ==
No.	Title	Length
1.	"Burn Masculinity"	2:02
2.	"Richard and Judy"	2:59
3.	"Friday Night"	3:12
4.	"Speak When You're Spoken To"	3:27
5.	"August 17th"	2:38
6.	"Everybody Needs to Be in Love"	3:33
7.	"Vicious Machine"	2:59
8.	"I Want to Kiss You"	2:51
9.	"Books and Hooks and Movements"	1:49
10.	"Binary"	3:15
11.	"Try to Be Hopeful"	4:46
