= Wolf Girl (band) =

English indie pop band

- Origin: London, England
- Genres: Indie pop, pop punk, noise pop
- Years active: 2013 – 2019
- Labels: Soft Power Records; Odd Box Records; Everything Sucks Music
- Past members: Healey Becks; Christabel Williams; Carl Farrugia; Chris Wood

Wolf Girl was a four-piece indie pop band from London, England. The band consisted of Healey Becks, Christabel Williams, Chris Wood and Carl Farrugia.

After releasing EP Mama's Boy on Soft Power Records in 2014, the band released their debut album We Tried with Odd Box Records in 2016. They played Indietracks Festival in 2014 and 2018 and the prestigious Sŵn Festival in Cardiff at the end of 2016. Second album Every Now & Then was released on Everything Sucks Music in October 2018. They disbanded in 2019 for unspecified reasons. Healey Becks now plays in Fightmilk.

Musically, they have been compared to The Flatmates, C86, Scarlet's Well, Sarah Records, Veronica Falls, Weezer, and Diet Cig.

== Discography ==
=== Albums ===
- We Tried - Odd Box Records, LP, MP3 (2016)
- Every Now & Then - Everything Sucks Music, LP, MP3 (2018)

=== EPs ===
- Mama's Boy - Soft Power Records, Cassette, MP3 (2014)

=== Singles ===
- "Moody" / "Get You" - Odd Box Records, 7" Single, MP3 (2017)
- "Toast For Dinner" - Everything Sucks Music, MP3, (2018)
- "Maths in the Real World" - Everything Sucks Music, MP3, (2018)
- "Dream Partner" - Everything Sucks Music, MP3, (2018)

=== Compilation appearances ===
- Hang In There - For The Sake of Tapes, Cassette, MP3, (2017)
