= Tunabunny =

American indie rock band

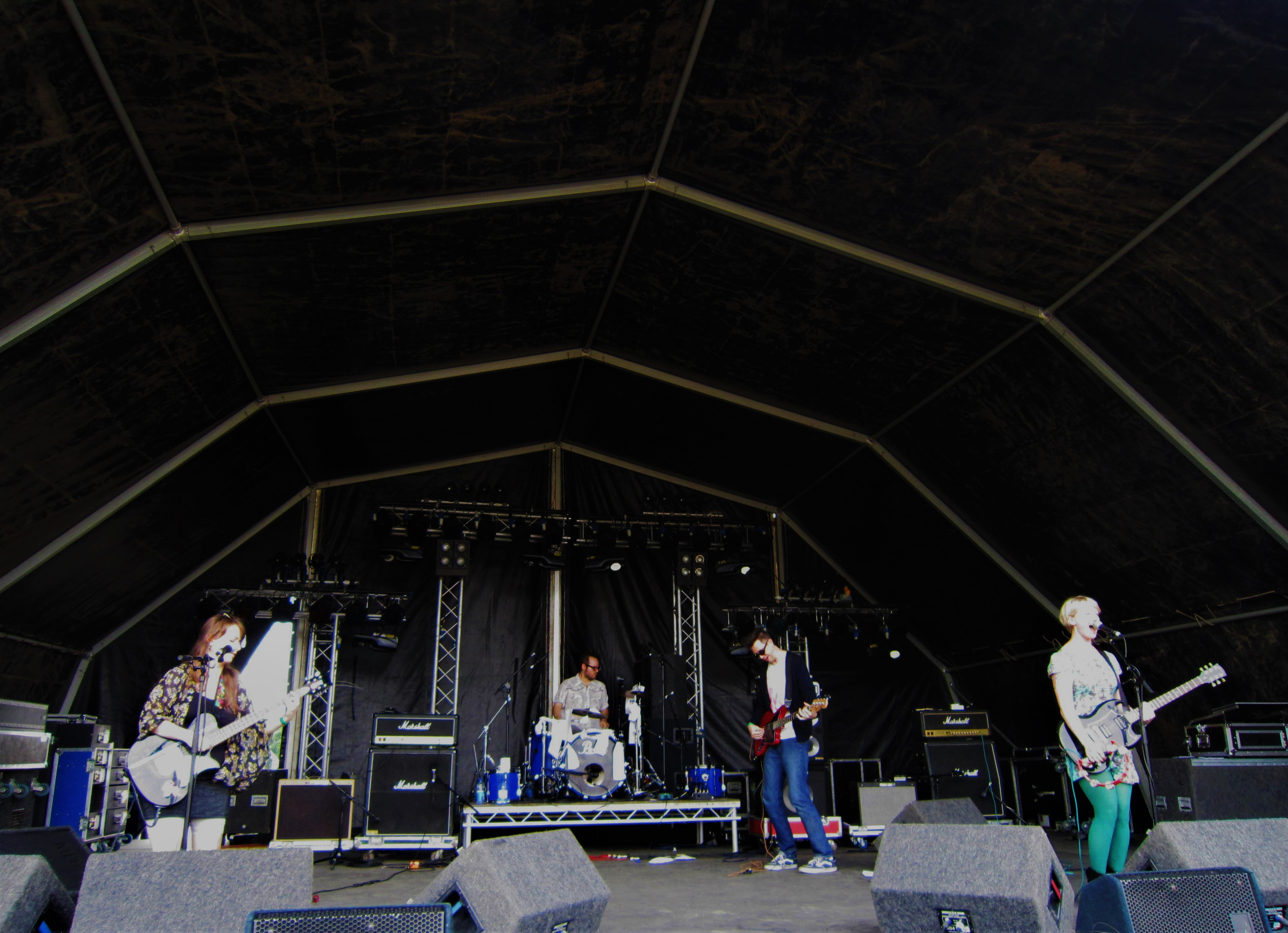
- Tunabunny performing at UK festival Indietracks in July 2013.

Background information
- Origin: Athens, Georgia, US
- Genres: Indie rock; noise pop; indiepop; riot grrrl; post punk
- Years active: 2008–present
- Labels: HHBTM
- Members: Brigette Herron; Scott Creney; Mary Jane Hassell; Jesse Stinnard
- Past members: Chloe Tewksbury

Tunabunny are an American indie rock band from Athens, Georgia, US, that formed in 2008.

== Biography ==
Tunabunny were formed in 2008 by Brigette Herron, Scott Creney, Mary Jane Hassell and Chloe Tewksbury. Following a split single (with Hulaboy) in 2009, Tunabunny released their eponymous debut album in 2010, issued as with their subsequent records by Athens label Happy Happy Birthday to Me Records. Second album Minima Moralia was released the following year to positive reviews, including from Razorcake.

Tewksbury was replaced by new drummer Jesse Stinnard in time for a UK tour with Shrag in 2012 which saw the release of a split single between the two bands, a joint release on the Fortuna Pop! label. Third album Genius Fatigue followed, and was praised by Drowned in Sound, The Line of Best Fit and AllMusic. Tunabunny's next record Kingdom Technology was released in 2014 to further critical acclaim including from The Quietus. 2017 saw the release of double album PCP Presents Alice in Wonderland Jr, which was another well-received record, rated 10/10 by Drowned in Sound, and described by The Skinny as a "lo-fi masterpiece."

AllMusic have praised their "inspired career."

== Discography ==
=== Albums ===
- Tunabunny (2010)
- Minima Moralia (2011)
- Genius Fatigue (2013)
- Kingdom Technology (2014)
- PCP Presents Alice in Wonderland Jr (2017)

=== Singles ===
- "Outer Space Is the Centre of the Earth" (2009) (split single with Hulaboy)
- "(Song for My) Solar Sister" (2011)
- "Locusts" (2012) (split single with Shrag)
- "Form a Line" (2012)
