= Soft Power Records =

Scottish independent record label

- Founded: 2010
- Founder: Bek & Graeme Galloway
- Defunct: 2016
- Genre: Indie pop, indie rock, noise pop
- Country of origin: United Kingdom
- Location: Livingston, West Lothian
- Official website: https://softpowerrecords.bandcamp.com/ http://www.softpowervinyl.bigcartel.com/

Soft Power Records was a Scottish independent record label and online record shop based in Livingston, West Lothian and active from 2010 to 2016. It was founded by Bek & Graeme Galloway. It specialised in indie and noise pop music.

All of their releases were in an analogue format (though accompanied by digital downloads), usually vinyl records or cassette.

== Artists released by Soft Power ==
- Aggi Doom
- Beat Mark
- Big Wave
- Blood of the Bull
- Cruising
- The Debutantes
- Dirty Beaches
- Dog Legs
- Dora Maar
- H. Grimace
- The Hollows
- Holy Motors
- HUNK!
- Kaspar Hauser
- Obedient Wives Club
- Conor Prendergast
- The Rosy Crucifixion
- September Girls
- The Spook School
- The Tamborines
- Theoretical Girl
- Trogons
- The Wharves
- Witching Waves
- Wolf Girl
