= Ste McCabe =

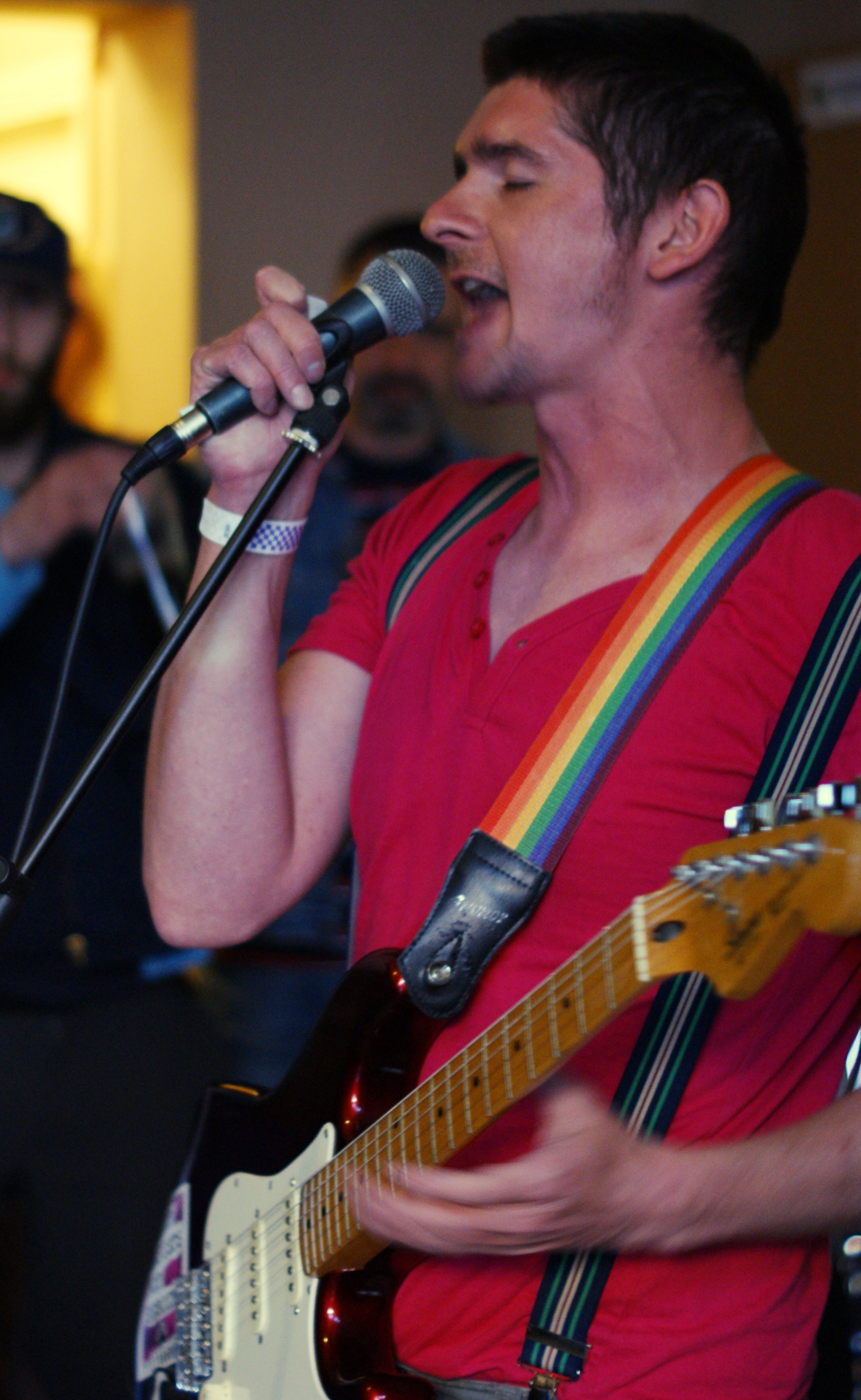
- Ste McCabe at the New Oxford, Salford, as part of the Sounds From The Other City Festival, 2011.

Background information
- Born: Liverpool, England
- Genres: Indie, queercore, punk
- Years active: 2006–2014
- Label: Cherryade Records

Ste McCabe (from Liverpool, England) is an English DIY, queercore singer-songwriter, previously based in Manchester, and later Edinburgh, Scotland.

== Career ==
McCabe started performing solo in 2006, using only a drum machine and electric guitar as an alternative to a full band. (Previous band Stephen Nancy had existed between 1999 and 2002.) In 2008 he signed to Cherryade Records with whom he released his first official solo EP "Pink Bomb" as a limited-edition CD. His first album, Hate Mail followed later that year and received favourable reviews from underground/alternative press and mainstream gay media such as Gay Times, who described McCabe as "armed with a mean, lean, bedroom Disco drum machine, a cheap guitar and his biggest asset; a mind and a loud mouth to speak it." Over the following year McCabe became known as an LGBT rights activist as well as a popular underground musician, performing at events such as London Literature Festival at Royal Festival Hall and Indietracks Festival in Derbyshire. The same year he joined Dandelion Radio as a DJ, playing "leftist, feminist, queer positive" underground music.

McCabe's second album, Murder Music, was released in 2009, and featured a duet with avant-garde performer David Hoyle. He was subsequently featured in Time Out, Gay Times and Artrocker magazine, which in September 2010 featured his open letter to The Pope protesting against Benedict XVI's visit to the UK. He has performed at LGBT rights festivals across Europe such as Noc Walpurgii in Warsaw, Poland and Gay Pride 2010 in Bristol, England.

Ste has received national UK radio play on stations such as BBC 6 Music and BBC Radio 1. With the release of his third album, Bad Kitty, he toured Europe again in October and November 2012.

McCabe performed onstage with English leftist singer Billy Bragg at Glastonbury Festival in 2013. His final album, Brains of Britain, was released in October 2014 and included a collaboration with Bragg. He promoted the album with a final tour of the US.

== Discography ==
=== Singles ===
- "Accessorise" (2011) (Bubblegum Records)
- "Ste McCabe/Mayr" split vinyl (2013) (Unrecords)

=== EPs ===
- Detect and Abort (2000) [as/with Stephen Nancy]
- No Apologies (2002) [as/with Stephen Nancy]
- Pink Bomb (2008) (Cherryade Records)
- Harrowing Breakdown (2010) (Cherryade Records)

=== Albums ===
- Hate Mail (2008) (Cherryade Records)
- Murder Music (2009) (Cherryade Records)
- Bad Kitty (2012) (Cherryade Records)
- Brains of Britain (2014) (Manekineko Music)
