= Witching Waves (band) =

DIY indie post-punk band from London

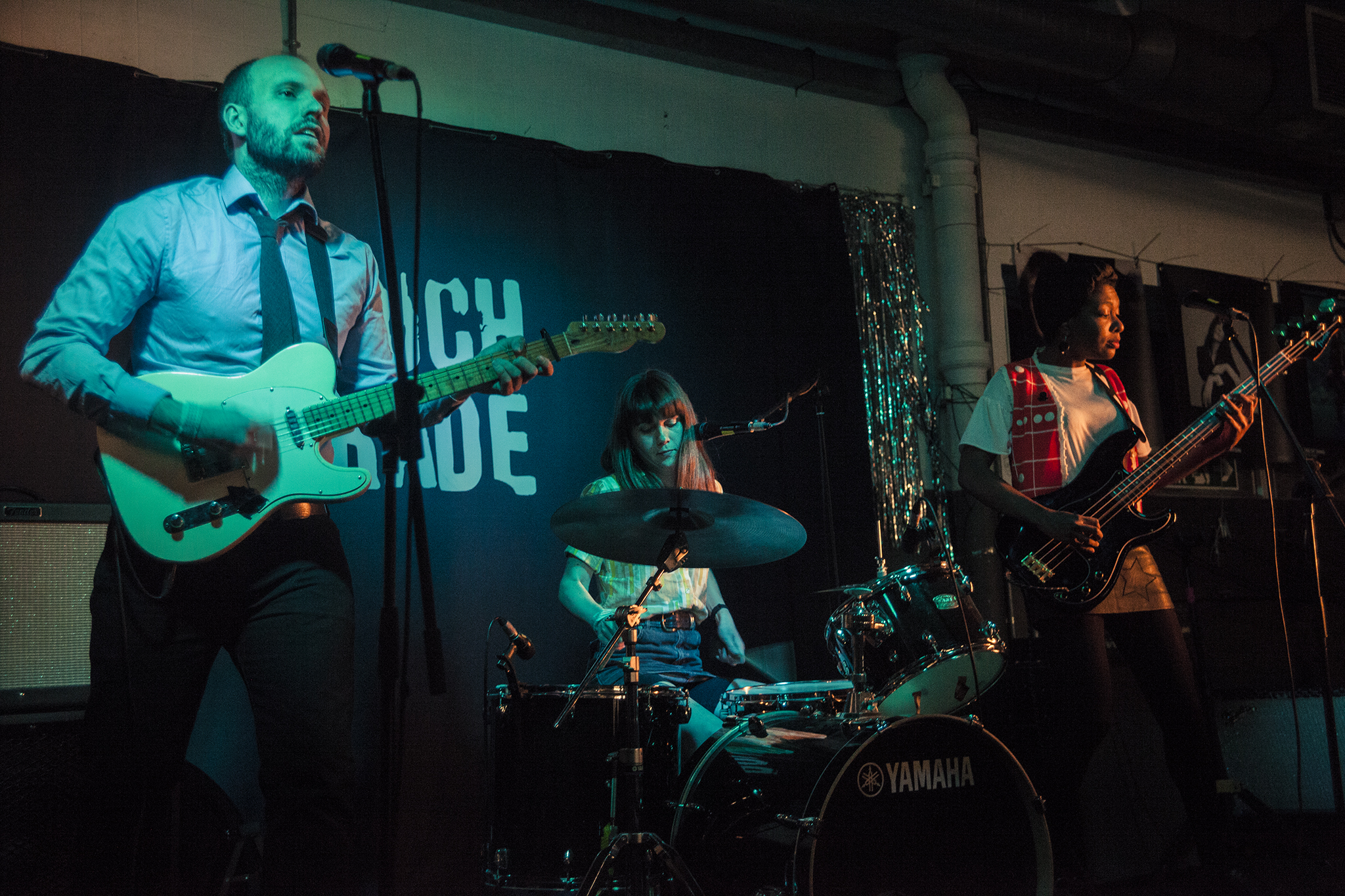

Background information
- Origin: London, England
- Genres: Post punk, noise pop, indiepop, indie rock
- Years active: 2013–present
- Labels: Soft Power Records; HHBTM; Odd Box Records; Specialist Subject Records
- Members: Emma Wigham; Mark Jasper; Will Fitzpatrick; Estella Adeyeri
- Past members: Ed Shellard
- Website: https://witchingwaves.bandcamp.com/

Witching Waves are a DIY indie post-punk band from London, England. Drowned in Sound hailed their debut long-player as one of the best albums of 2014. They have released four full-length albums on independent record labels.

== History ==
Witching Waves (Emma Wigham: drums; Mark Jasper: guitars) formed in late 2013 following the dissolution of Wigham's previous band Weird Menace, which Jasper had also joined in its final incarnation. The new band released a debut self-titled EP on the Suplex Cassettes label the same year and a cassette single on Soft Power Records in early 2014.

Witching Waves’ first album Fear of Falling Down was released in 2014 to positive reviews. A cassette EP of cover versions was also issued as a joint release with As Ondas, including each band versioning one of the other band's songs. Witching Waves became a trio the same year with the addition of bassist Ed Shellard (also of Gloss Rejection).

2015 saw a split EP of new material, released to mark a joint UK tour with Rattle; the band also previewed new tracks from their forthcoming second album, including “Twister” which Clash called “feral yet sharply melodic”.

Crystal Café was released in 2016 to widespread praise, drawing comparisons to Sonic Youth, Pixies, the Vaselines and the Cure. The album was released in the United States by HHBTM Records, and short tours of the US and Europe followed; the band also played Indietracks. Estella Adeyeri (also of Charmpit and Big Joanie; previously of Dirtygirl and Junk) joined Witching Waves the same year, replacing Shellard on bass.

In April 2019 the band released their third album, Persistence, on Specialist Subject Records. Like all of their releases to that date it was recorded by Jasper at his (now former) Hackney recording studio Sound Savers. The band recorded the album on tape live over two days.

In September 2019, they supported Australian band Camp Cope on a UK tour.

After a hiatus and a relocation from London, fourth album 'Streams And Waterways' was released in December 2023, with Jasper and Wigham joined by bassist Will Fitzpatrick.

== Discography ==
=== Albums ===
- Fear of Falling Down - Soft Power Records, LP/DD (2014) Odd Box Records, LP/DD (2017)
- Crystal Café - Soft Power Records UK / HHBTM Records USA, LP/DD (2016)
- Persistence - Specialist Subject Records, LP/CD/DD (2019)
- Streams And Waterways - Specialist Subject Records, LP/DD (2023)

=== Extended plays ===
- Witching Waves [First Tape] - Suplex Cassettes, MC/DD (2013)
- Concrete - Soft Power Records, MC/DD (2014)
- The Covers Tape EP [Split w/As Ondas], MC/DD (2014)
- Witching Waves/Rattle EP - Seeing Double, MC/DD (2015)

=== Compilation appearances ===
- "You" on Days of Our Youth - an Eclectic Compilation of Delta 5 Covers - Bomb The Twist, 2016
