= The Manhattan Love Suicides =

British rock band

- Origin: Leeds, West Yorkshire, United Kingdom
- Genres: Alternative rock, indie rock
- Years active: 2006–2009, 2013-2016
- Labels: Squirrel Records (UK), Magic Marker (US), Odd Box Records (UK)
- Members: Caroline McChrystal; Adam John Miller; Darren Lockwood; Rachel Barker
- Past members: Eddy Lines
- Website: myspace.com/themls

The Manhattan Love Suicides was a UK-based rock band from Leeds, originally active between 2006 and 2009, and then again between 2013 and 2016.

== Biography ==
The band takes its name from a 1985 short film by Richard Kern and was influenced by acts such as The Velvet Underground and The Jesus & Mary Chain. Allmusic's Tim Sendra described the band as having "...knack for buzzy three-minute guitar pop tunes" and Pitchfork Media's Marc Hogan referred to their style as "...feedback-streaked guitar pop..." Their eponymous debut album was released in 2006 in the UK as vinyl-only (although it was made available in the US in CD format through the Magic Marker record label) (Note: The album was re-released in the UK as a 23-track CD including a bonus DVD with 10 videos in 2009) and a 27-track compilation, entitled Burnt Out Landscapes, followed two years later. The band announced they had split on 28 June 2009 on their MySpace page.

The band reformed in 2013 with "(Never Stop) Hating You" appearing on YouTube, and released a new album More Heat! More Panic! in March 2015.

The Manhattan Love Suicides; cover of the 2009 UK CD re-release on Squirrel Records

== Album discography ==
- Manhattan Love Suicides (2006)
- Burnt Out Landscapes (2008)
- Dandelion Radio Session (2010)
- More Heat! More Panic! (2015)
