= Shrag =

British post-punk-influenced indiepop band

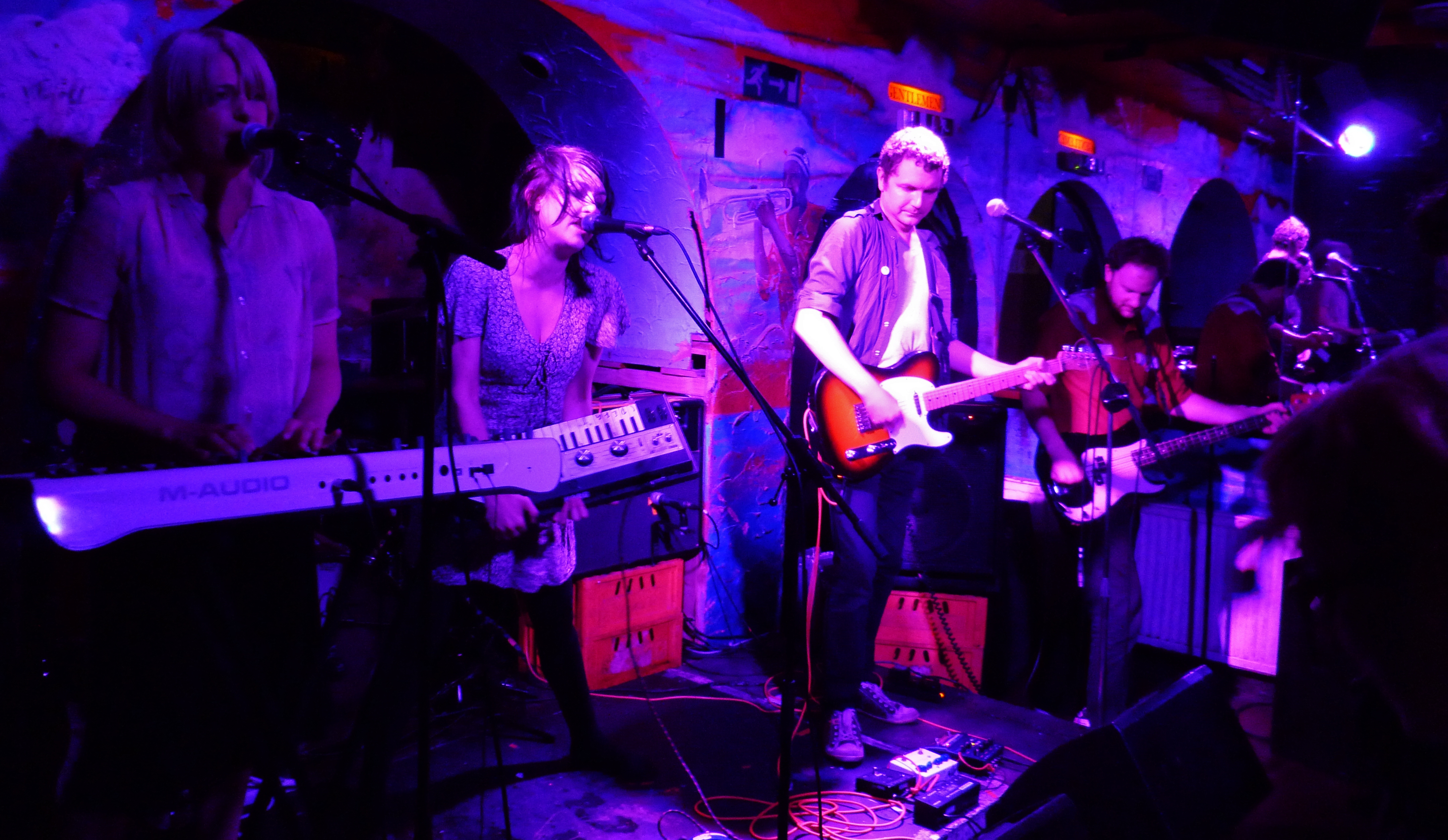
- Shrag at the Shacklewell Arms in 2012.

Background information
- Genres: Indie pop, post-punk, riot grrl
- Years active: 2003–2013
- Labels: Where It's at Is Where You Are, Fortuna Pop!
- Past members: Helen King; Bob Brown; Steph Goodman; Russell Warrior; Andy Pyne; Leigh Anne Walter; Nick Hills

Shrag were a British post-punk-influenced indie pop band, based in London and Brighton. The band released three albums on the Where It's at Is Where You Are label, the last a joint release on Fortuna Pop!

== Formation and early years ==
Shrag's first release was the home-recorded song "Punk Grammar", which debuted on Under The Beach, A Heart Attack – a 2003 compilation album and fanzine of Brighton bands, put together by local club night It Came From The Sea, and featuring a foreword by the then Brighton-based music critic Everett True. The fanzine tells the story of Shrag's formation in a comic book format. At the tail-end of a party in Brighton's Sussex Heights residential tower block, the remaining five revellers – made up of local DJs, promoters, academics and musicians – decide to start a band, named Sussex Heights Roving Artists Group.

Shrag continued to build a growing fanbase with steady touring, both supporting The Pains of Being Pure at Heart and headlining their own tours, but ongoing medical problems caused drummer Leigh Anne Walter to be replaced for many live performances by Medicine & Duty drummer Andy Pyne, who in 2009 became a permanent member of the band.

Consequently, many of the tracks Shrag had originally intended to appear on their forthcoming album were either shelved or re-recorded by the new line-up, while new songs that the band began working on saw them turning away from the lighter, more poppy original template for the album into much darker and more introspective territory.

The first single from Life! Death! Prizes!, Shrag's second album, was "Rabbit Kids", an anthemic love song which won the band significant mainstream radio play and plaudits in Pitchfork, All Music Guide and Drowned in Sound. Musically the band had concentrated their musical range (which had previously drifted from B-52s-esque guitar pop to synth-led ballads) into more concise, driving rock songs, although a string section on the epic album closer Coda and the waltzy Furnishings showed a softer, more vulnerable side to the band. The album's centrepiece, "The Habit Creep" was a harrowing spoken word piece depicting an individual unravelling psychologically, and the download single "Ghosts Before Breakfast" represented the noisier, artier influences of bands like Prolapse and Life Without Buildings.

Released in October 2010, Life! Death! Prizes! was equally as acclaimed as its predecessor and provided a platform for the band to perform in New York at the CMJ Music Marathon, and to record a BBC Radio 1 session at Maida Vale Studios.

== Canines ==
Shrag's third album, Canines, was released in July 2012. Produced by Andy Miller, the album was released by WIAIWYA in conjunction with Fortuna Pop!.

This is how Helen described the new album: "We wrote 'Canines' between January and August last year in a long series of slightly fevered evenings ensconced in the shed at the bottom of Bob's garden. It's a pop record about bones and skin and cities and compulsions and love and confusion. It's a bit strange, but you can dance to some of it, and it makes a particular kind of sense to us, which feels very exciting".

"Tendons in the Night" (a split with Tunabunny), "Show Us Your Canines", and "Devastating Bones" were released as singles. A non-album 7" single, "Unseasonal Thoughts", was also released as part of WIAIWYA's 7777777 record club series.

Reviews have been positive with BBC Music calling particular attention to Helen's "exuberant use of language... an enjoyment of, and gift for, words," NME praising the band's "palpable songwriting muscle", and Drowned in Sound interpreting the album as a sign of big things to come: "With a bit more TLC and fine tuning around the edges, their piece de resistance may well be just around the corner."

Shrag played a radio session for Marc Riley on 6Music on 2 January 2013, during which they announced they were to split. Their final single was released on 11 February, and their last gig was at London's Lexington on 15 March.

== Discography ==
=== Albums ===
- Shrag (2009), Where It's at Is Where You Are
- Life! Death! Prizes! (2010), Where It's at Is Where You Are
- Canines (2012), Fortuna Pop!/Where It's at Is Where You Are

=== Singles ===
- "Pregnancy Scene/Mark E Smith" (2006)
- "Intelligent Theft/Cupboard Love" (2006)
- "Talk to the Left/Hopelessly Wasted" (2007)
- "Different Glue/Lost Dog" (2008)
- "Long Term Monster/Forty Five 45s" (2008)
- "Rabbit Kids/Erratic Fictions" (2009)
- "Tights in August" (2010 download single)
- "Ghosts Before Breakfast" (2011 download EP)
- "Tendons in the Night" (2012 split single with Tunabunny)
- "Show Us Your Canines" (2012)
- "Devastating Bones" (2012)
- "Unseasonal Thoughts" (2012)
- "On the Spines of Old Cathedrals" (2013)
