= Al Montfort =

Australian musician (born 1986)

- Also known as: Snake
- Born: Alistair Montfort
- Occupations: musician, producer
- Instruments: sarangi, guitar, saxophone, drums, vocals,
- Labels: Aarght, Anti Fade, R.I.P Society, Upset the Rhythm
- Member of: Chateau, Dick Diver, East Link, Lower Plenty, Russell St Bombings, Sleeper & Snake, Straightjacket Nation, Terry, Total Control, UV Race

Alistair "Al" Montfort (born 1986) is an Australian musician. He is a member of Chateau, Dick Diver, East Link, Lower Plenty, Russell St Bombings, Sleeper & Snake, Straightjacket Nation, Terry, Total Control, and UV Race, as well as performing under the solo name Snake.

== Career ==
Al Montfort was born December 1986 in East Melbourne, Victoria. He grew up in Northcote and Yarragon, learnt bass at school, and joined Straightjacket Nation when he was still a student. He then formed UV Race with Marcus Reichsteiner and Moses Twotimes, and later formed other groups such as Lower Plenty, and Eastlink.

Vice reported in 2014 that Montfort was a member of 24 bands around Melbourne. He was nominated for Australian of the Year in 2013, but lost to Adam Goodes.

He released a solo album under the name Snake in 2014 where he played guitar, saxophone, drum machine, buffalo horn flute, and sarangi. The self-titled tape was released on his label Hidiotic, and was followed in 2018 by the album Snake & Friends on R.I.P Society Records.

Montfort has collaborated with his partner Amy Hill on two albums as Sleeper and Snake. They previously collaborated on Snake's 'Forever New', and also perform together as members of Terry.

Montfort has also recorded albums for bands Primo!, and The Shifters.
