= Jake Robertson (musician) =

Australian musician

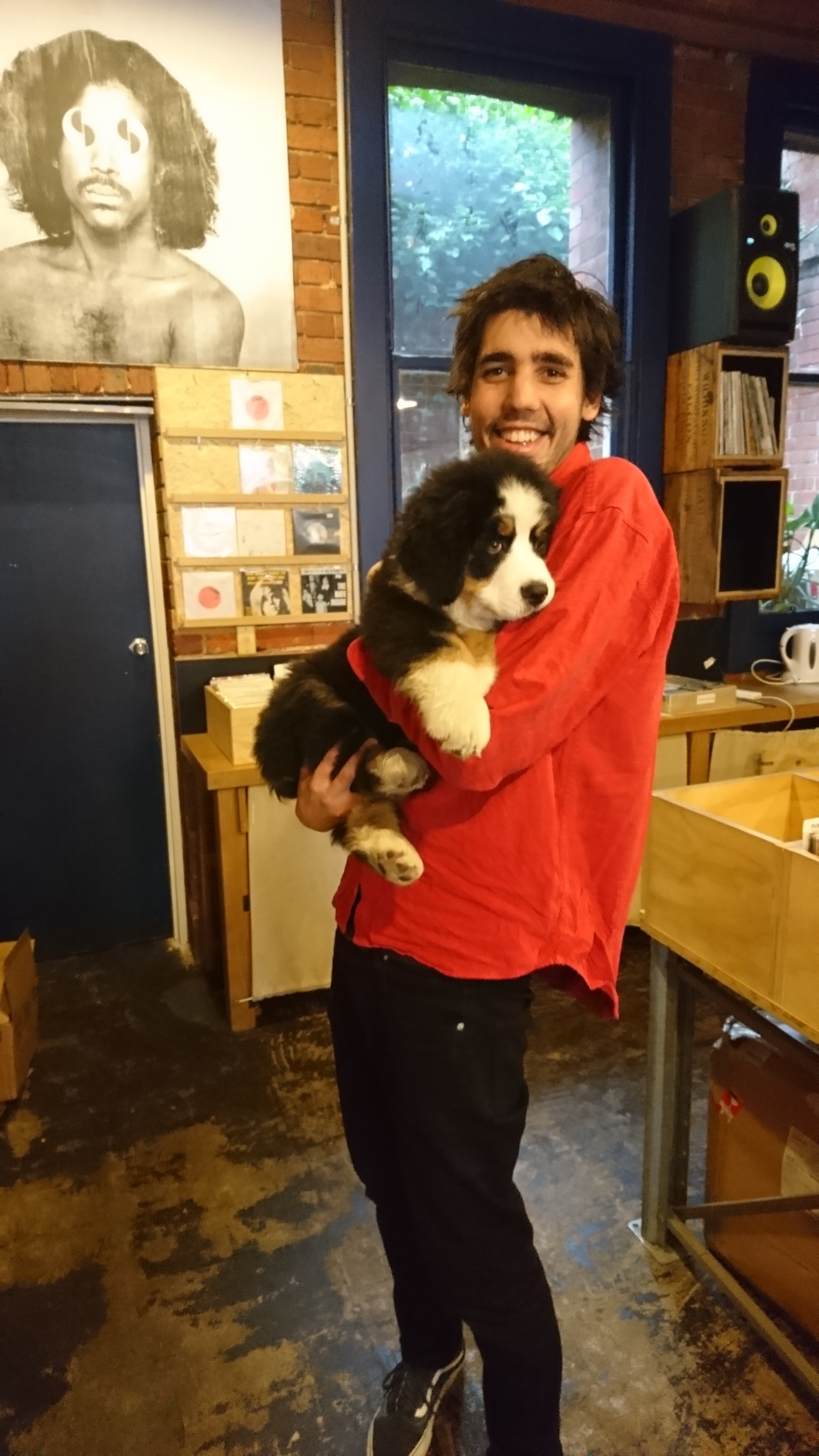
- Jake Robertson - Photographed by Max Kohane

Background information
- Also known as: Alien Nosejob
- Origin: Central Coast, New South Wales, Australia
- Genres: Rock; Punk rock
- Labels: Aarght Records, Anti Fade Records, Chapter Music
- Member of: Alien Nosejob, Ausmuteants, Drug Sweat, Hierophants, Leather Towel, Modal Melodies, No Limit, School Damage, Smarts, Swab, The Frowning Clouds, The Snoozefests

Jake Robertson is an Australian musician from Central Coast, New South Wales, who moved to Geelong, Victoria in 2010. He has released music as Alien Nosejob, and in the bands Ausmuteants, Hierophants, Leather Towel, Modal Melodies, Smarts, and The Frowning Clouds. Many of these releases are on Anti Fade Records.

== Career ==
Jake Robertson formed Ausmuteants with Billy Gardner in 2011, after Robertson temporarily sat in as drummer for Gardner's band The Living Eyes. They were later joined by bandmates Marc Dean and Shaun Connor. The band first performed live together in 2012 and released a cassette Split Personalities that year, before releasing the album Amusements in 2013. Ausmuteants released three further albums, and received praise overseas, with Pitchfork listed them amongst their Best Underground Garage Punk Albums of 2016 list. A 2019 album The World in Handcuffs was written entirely by guitarist Shaun Connor. It was nominated for the Australian Independent Record Labels Association (AIR) Best Independent Punk Album or EP at the 2020 AIR Awards.

In 2017 Robertson's band School Damage signed with Chapter Music, prior to the release of their self-titled debut album, and the preceding single Tall Poppies. The band was formed in 2013 by Robertson and Carolyn Hawkins of Parsnip, before they were joined by Jeff Ratyand and Dani Damage. A second album A To X followed in 2018, also on Chapter Music.

2017 also saw the debut single from Robertson's solo project Alien Nosejob, which he self-released. The project was meant as an anonymous one-off release, but has grown into a four-piece band.

While promoting Alien Nosejob's fourth album Paint It Clear, Robertson revealed he was working with Violetta Del Conte-Race of Primo!. Their collaborative project Modal Melodies released a self-titled album in 2022 and entered AIR's album chart at #5.

== Record labels ==
Robertson joined Aarght Records in 2015 to run the label with founder Richard Stanley. The label released several albums featuring Robertson including Ausmuteants, but hasn't released anything since 2019. Since then Robertson has primarily released his music through Anti Fade Records, which is run by Bill Gardner who is also a member of Ausmuteants and Smarts alongside Robertson.

Outside of Australia, albums by Ausmuteants were released by Goner Records in the United States, Hierophants and No Limit have been released by Goodbye Boozy Records in Italy, and Smarts and Alien Nosejob has also been released in the US by Feel It Records and Iron Lung Records.

== Discography ==
This is a partial album discography of bands featuring Jake Robertson.

Ausmuteants

- Split Personalities (2012) - Anti Fade Records
- Amusements (2013) - Aarght Records
- Order Of Operation (2014) - Aarght Records
- Band Of The Future (2016) - Aarght Records
- The World in Handcuffs (2019) - Anti Fade Records

Hierophants

- Parallax Error (2015) - Aarght Records
- Spitting Out Moonlight (2019) - Anti Fade Records

Leather Towel

- IV (2016) - Aarght Records

Smarts

- Who Needs Smarts, Anyway? (2020) - Anti Fade Records

Alien Nose Job

- Various Fads And Technological Achievements (2018) - Anti Fade Records
- Once Again The Present Becomes The Past (2020) - Anti Fade Records
- Suddenly Everything Is Twice As Loud (2020) - Anti Fade Records
- Paint It Clear (2021) - Anti Fade Records

Modal Melodies

- Modal Melodies (2022) - Anti Fade Records

== AIR Chart positions ==
The Australian Independent Record Labels Association (AIR) charts track the sales of Australia's highest selling independent artists.

Alien Nose Job

- Once Again The Present Becomes The Past - #3 100% Independent Album / #7 Independent Label Albums (12 Oct 2020)
- Paint It Clear - #4 100% Independent Album / #13 Independent Label Albums (22 Nov 2021)

Smarts

- Who Needs Smarts, Anyway? - #3 100% Independent Album / #4 Independent Label Albums (26 Oct 2020)

Modal Melodies

- Modal Melodies - #5 100% Independent Album #10 Independent Label Albums (23 May 2022)

== Awards ==
2014 - Music Victoria Awards - Ausmuteants - Ausmuteants - Won: Best Heavy Album

2018 - Music Victoria Awards - Jake Robertson - Nominated: Best Male Musician

2019 - Australian Music Prize - Ausmuteants — Present The World In Handcuffs - Nominated

2020 - Australian Music Prize - Ausmuteants — Present The World In Handcuffs - Nominated: Best Independent Punk Album Or EP
