= Terry (band) =

Australian music group

- Origin: Melbourne, Victoria, Australia
- Genres: Rock
- Labels: Aarght, Anti Fade, R.I.P Society, Upset the Rhythm
- Members: Al Montfort, Amy Hill, Xanthe Waite, Zephyr Pavey

Terry are an Australian rock band. Since forming in 2015, they have released four albums.

== History ==
Terry were formed in Mexico 2015 by two Australian couples, Al Montfort and Amy Hill, Xanthe Waite and Zephyr Pavey, and released their debut single 'Talk About Terry' on English label Upset the Rhythm, followed by their debut album 'Terry HQ' in 2016.

The band have been praised for their wordplay and laidback style of rock music, often described as underground or indie rock.

After three albums released in quick succession, the members of Terry focused on their other bands, and other aspects of their lives as Waite and Pavey moved to New South Wales, while Montfort and Hill remained in Victoria. After the COVID-19 pandemic lead to forced isolation and began demoing what became their fourth album 'Call Me Terry'. The album was released in Australia on Anti Fade Records and reached #4 on the AIR Charts.

== Discography ==
Albums

- Terry HQ (2016)
- Remember Terry (2017)
- I'm Terry (2018)
- Call Me Terry (2023)

== Charts ==
Date	Release	Chart	Peak position
2015	Talk About Terry	UK Physical Singles Chart (Official Charts)	73
2017	8 Girls	UK Physical Singles Chart UK (Official Charts)	91
2019	Spud	UK Physical Singles Chart UK (Official Charts)	17
2019	Spud	UK Vinyl Singles Chart (Official Charts)	11
2021	Call Me Terry	Australian 100% Independent Albums (AIR)	4
