= Vintage Crop (band) =

Australian post-punk band

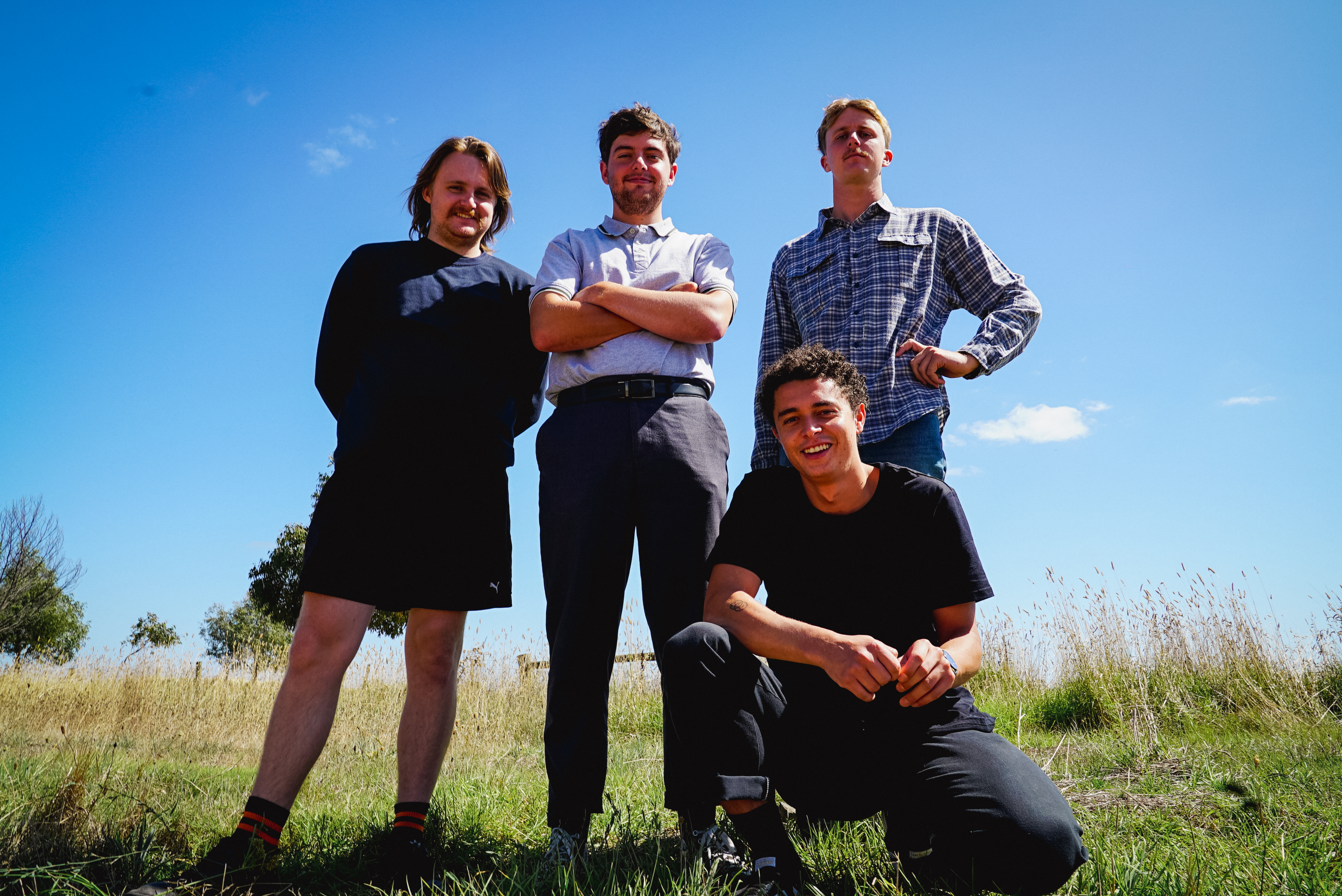

Background information
- Origin: Geelong, Victoria, Australia
- Genres: Alternative rock; post-punk; garage rock; egg punk; indie rock
- Years active: 2016-present
- Labels: Anti Fade Records, Upset The Rhythm
- Members: Jack Cherry; Tyson Harper; Luke O'Brien; Tyler O'Brien
- Past members: Jack Massey
- Website: vintagecrop.bandcamp.com

Vintage Crop are an Australian post-punk band from Geelong. They took their name from the English horse Vintage Crop.

== History ==
Vintage Crop formed as a solo project for Jack Cherry, who would record in his bedroom and upload songs to SoundCloud. He was later joined by guitarist Tyson Harper, and brothers Tyler and Luke O'Brien in 2016. The band made their debut in November 2016 with their EP Coming Up. The EP was released by Weather Vane Records, a label run by band member Jack Cherry in Geelong. It was mastered by Mikey Young of Total Control, who has continued working with the group on each subsequent release.

On 14 April 2017, Vintage Crop released their debut album TV Organs. It was reissued in France in 2018 by Polaks Records.

Their second album New Age was released in 2018 by Geelong-based Anti Fade Records, and was followed by a tour of Europe. This was followed by the album Serve To Serve Again, released in August 2020 by Anti Fade in Australia, and Upset! The Rhythm in the UK.

In March 2022, NME Australia reported Vintage Crop had released a new single "Double Slants", and announced their fourth album Kibitzer would be released on 24 June 2022. The album was recorded in one day, and was mixed and mastered by Mikey Young.

== Discography ==
=== Studio albums ===
List of studio albums, with release date and label shown
Title	Details
TV Organs	Released: April 2017; Label: Weather Vane Records (WVR 002); Formats: Cassette, Digital download, streaming
New Age	Released: April 2018; Label: Weather Vane Records (WVR 010), ANTI FADE records (ANT-041); Formats: CD, LP, Digital download, streaming
Serve to Serve Again	Released: 7 August 2020; Label: ANTI FADE records (ANT-071); Formats: CD, LP, digital
Kibitzer	Released: 24 June 2022; Label: ANTI FADE records (ANT-079); Formats: CD, LP, digital

=== Extended plays ===
List of EPs, with release date and label shown
Title	Album details
Coming Up	Released: November 2016; Label: Weather Vane Records (WVR-001); Formats: Digital download, streaming
Live At Barwon Club (with Gonzo)	Released: 2017; Label: Weather Vane Records (WVR 006); Formats: Cassette (50 copies)
Company Man	Released: 2019; Label: ANTI FADE records (ANT-051); Formats: 7" LP, Digital download, streaming
Live in France	Released: 2020; Label: Weather Vane Records (WVR 019); Formats: Cassette (50 copies)
