= Feature (band) =

London-based indie rock trio

- Origin: London, England
- Genre: Post-punk
- Years active: 2012–2017
- Label: Upset The Rhythm
- Past members: Jen Calleja; Liv Willars; Heather Perkins

Feature was a London-based indie rock trio formed in 2012 by Jen Calleja (drums and vocals, also of Sauna Youth) and Liv Willars (guitar and vocals), with Heather Perkins (bass and vocals) joining in 2014. The band released two EPs, a split single with Perkins' other band Slowcoaches, and an LP, before breaking up in 2017.

== History ==
Feature was formed in London by drummer/vocalist Jen Calleja (also of the band Sauna Youth) and guitarist/vocalist Liv Willars in 2012.

They played as a duo for two years before they were joined by bassist Heather Perkins of the band Slowcoaches, with whom they released a split single in 2015, as well as touring together.

The band also played with American groups like Chain and the Gang, Protomartyr, and the Julie Ruin, and appeared at Supernormal Festival in Oxfordshire.

By the time their first album, Banishing Ritual, was released on 7 April 2017 by Upset the Rhythm, the trio had gone their separate ways. Willars moved to Sheffield and now plays in Sister Wives; Calleja continued on with Sauna Youth, their alter ego band Monotony, and Gold Foil; while Perkins continued to play with Slowcoaches.

== Discography ==
=== Albums ===
- Banishing Ritual - Upset The Rhythm, 12" LP, MP3 (2017)

=== EPs ===
- Memory - Cazenove Tapes, Cassette, MP3 (2012)
- Culture Of The Copy - Tye Die Tapes, Cassette, MP3 (2014)

=== Split Releases ===
- Tourists (with Slowcoaches) - Unwork Records, 7" Single, MP3 (2014)
