= APAtT =

English avant-garde act

a.P.A.t.T.
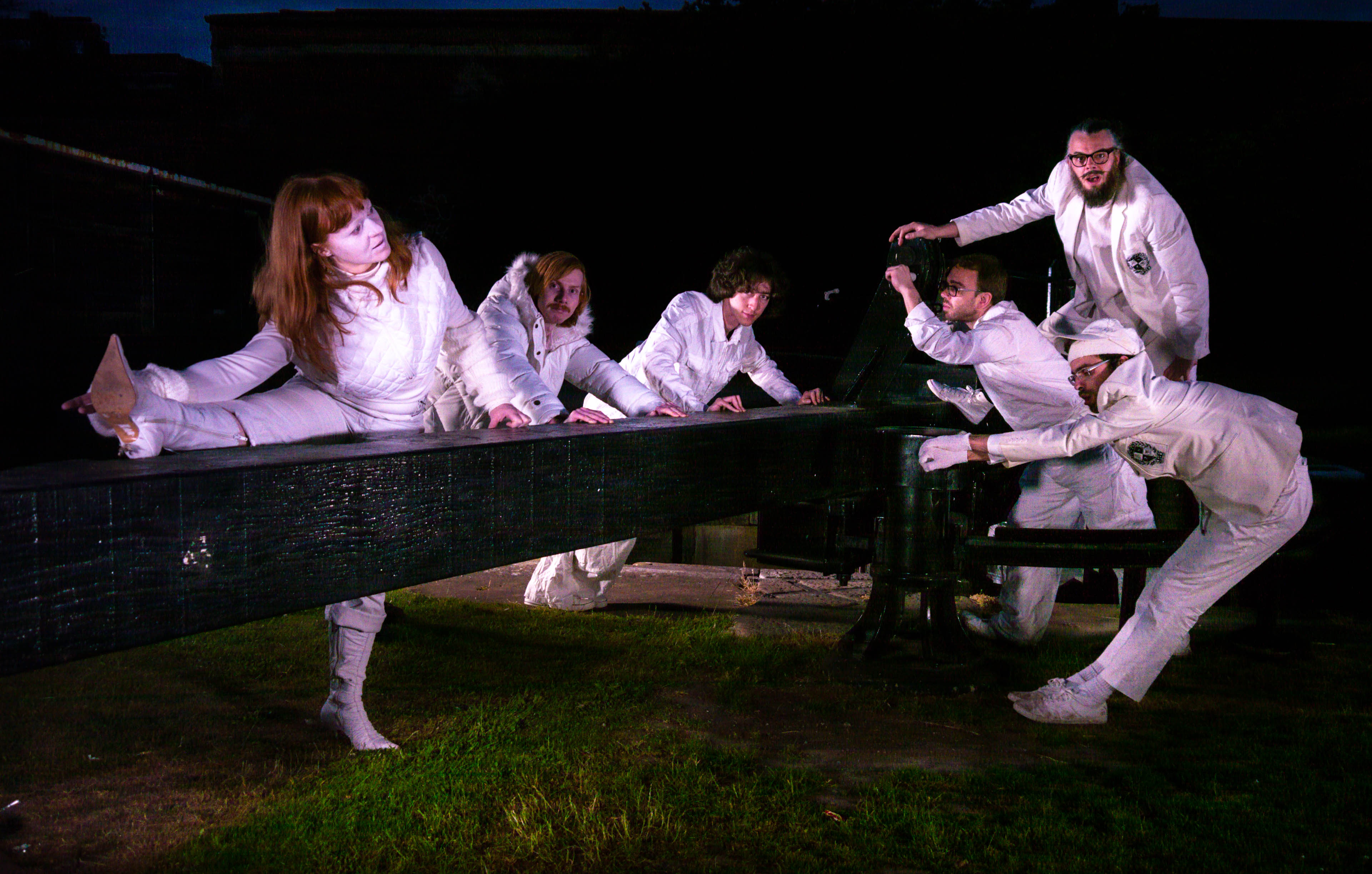
- Empress Play, Bossa Nova, Oscar Later; General Midi, Mr Phil, Col Legno

Background information
- Origin: Liverpool, England
- Genres: Experimental
- Years active: 2002–present
- Labels: Postmusic; Pickled Egg ! A N G R r ! Upset the Rhythm
- Members: General Midi; Dorothy Wave; Master Fader; Field Marshall Stack; Sir Kit Breaker; The Count In; The Researcher; Oscar Later; Colonel Panic; Major Arpeggio; Norma Lies; Empress Play; Bossa Nova; Phil Harmonic; Mister Phil; Col Legno; DC Offset; Boss DR-5; Private Dancer; Ana Crusis; Ed Room
- Website: apatt.com

a.P.A.t.T. (no set pronunciation) is an avant-garde act based in Liverpool, England, who are known for a mixture of musical, filmic and multi-disciplinary works. They perform as a live band as well as avant-garde and modern classical projects.

Among other things, they have performed live soundtracks to accompany films such as Nosferatu.; modern classical pieces such as In C by Terry Riley; and in 2013 they performed the premiere of a piece of music composed from the locations of bird droppings falling on large sheets of paper.

== Recordings ==
=== Singles and EPs ===
- (e.P.) - Self-released - Digital (2002)
- Fre(e.P.) - Self-released Digital (2005)
- a.P.A.t.T. vs Stig -12" Class A Audio - Vinyl (2008)
- Martins Quest - POSTMUSIC - Digital (2009)
- Paul the Record 12" - Upset the Rhythm - Digital (2010)
- Just Because - POSTMUSIC - Digital (2014)
- Cigarettes & Margarine POSTMUSIC - Digital (2020)
- Solipsism POSTMUSIC - Digital (2021)
- The Great Attractor POSTMUSIC - Digital (2022)
- It Keeps Going POSTMUSIC - Digital (2023)

=== Albums ===
- (L.P.) - Lowsley Sounds - CD - Digital (2004)
- Black & White Mass - Pickled Egg - CD - Digital (2008)
- a.P.A.t.T. / Peepholes (Upset the Rhythm, 2010) – split with Peepholes
- Ogadimma - !aNGRr!, POSTMUSIC - 12" - Digital (2012)
- Fun With Music - Pickled Egg, POSTMUSIC - 12" - Digital (2016)
- We - 9x9 Records, POSTMUSIC, Dur et Doux - 12" - CD Digital (2023)

=== Compilations ===
- Ch(e.a.)P CD - Digital -(2006)
- Bulk Dump - CD - Digital -(2010)
- apattuntiltedmixexclusivthankyoudotcom - Digital (2020)
- The Essential Now That's What I Call an a.P.A.t.T. Christmas Vol 1 Digital (2020)
