= Uranium Club =

American alternative rock band

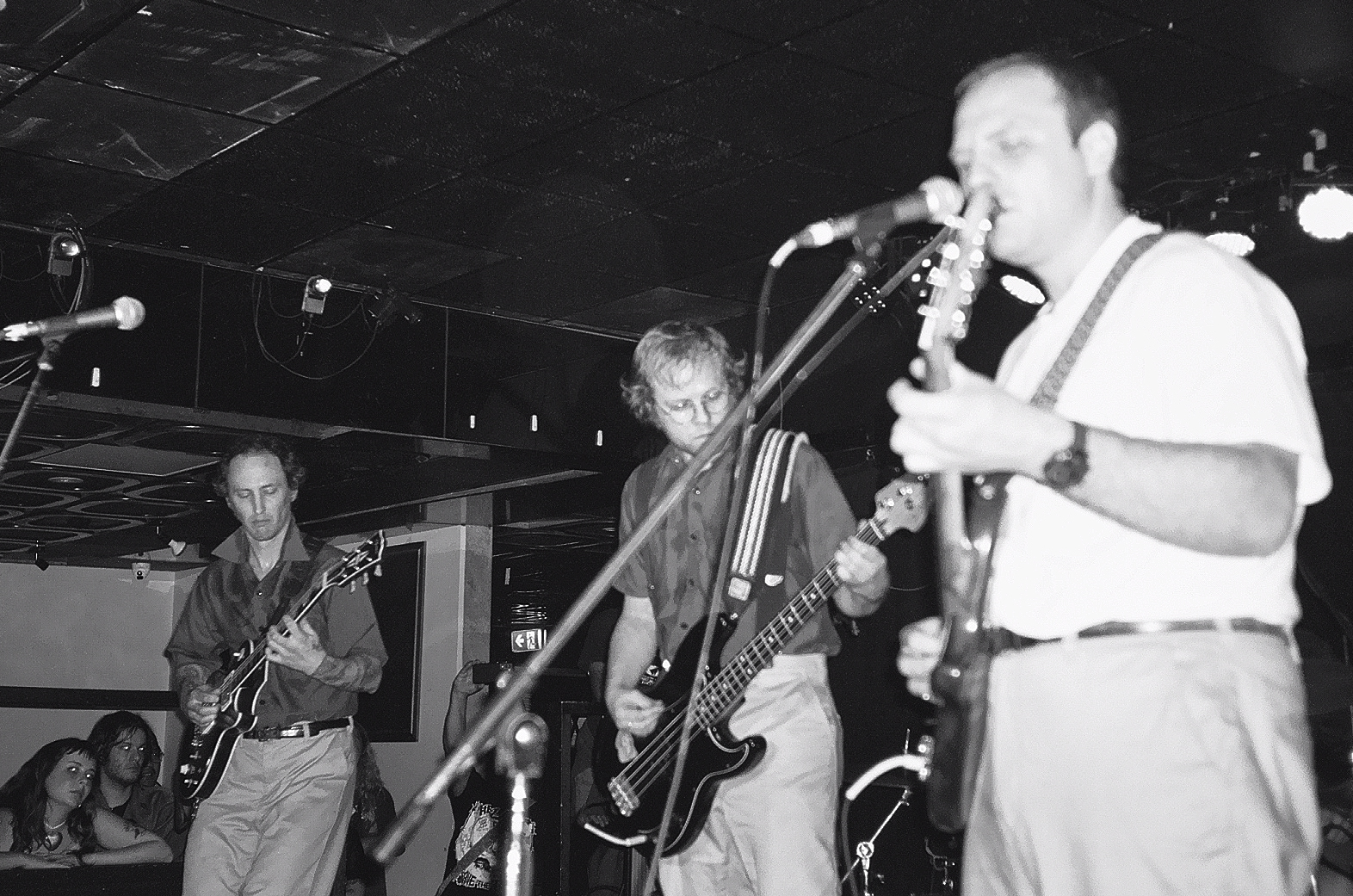
- Uranium Club performing in Sydney, 2024.

Background information
- Origin: Minneapolis, Minnesota
- Genres: Punk rock; post-punk; egg punk
- Years active: 2013–present
- Labels: Static Shock Records
- Members: Brendan Wells; Harry Wohl; Ian Stemper; Matt Stagner

Uranium Club (also known as The Minneapolis Uranium Club Band) is an American punk rock band based in Minneapolis. The band consists of members Brendan Wells, Harry Wohl, Ian Stemper and Matt Stagner. The band has released four albums on Static Shock Records and other independent labels, and been associated with the egg punk subgenre.

== History ==
Uranium Club formed in late 2013. In 2014, Uranium Club distributed their debut album, Human Exploration, originally as a self-released cassette. Maximum Rocknroll praised the album's "midwestern-freak aesthetic" and "choppy, sharp, borderline-angular" sound. The band secured a record deal with London record label Static Shock Records after cold calling founder Tom Ellis.

The band's sophomore album, All of Them Naturals, was released on 3 November 2016 on Static Shock Records and Fashionable Idiots, led by the single Who Made The Man? on 9 October. Describing the album as a work from "one of contemporary punk's most creative bands", Exclaim praised its "bizarre musical and lyrical ideas". Pitchfork considered the album's "twitchy neurosis" and "sardonic" humor to bridge a line between being "self-aware" and "aggressively obtuse". A live album, Live! at Arci Taun!, performed in Fidenza in November 2016, was released in 2017 on Castle Face.

The band's third album, The Cosmo Cleaners: The Higher Calling of Business Provocateurs, was released on 15 March 2019, although a test pressing of the album was distributed on tour previous year. A.V. Club praised the album's "jagged punk with a satirical edge", stating it found the band "sprawling out while building new alcoves in their weirdo mythology". Pitchfork named The Cosmo Cleaners as one of the ten best punk and garage rock albums of the year. PunkNews commended the band's "tight knit looseness" and resemblance to post-punk band Minutemen.

Uranium Club released their fourth album, Infants Under the Bulb, on 1 March 2024 through Anti Fade Records and Static Shock Records, led by single Small Grey Man on 18 January. Exclaim praised the album as "ambitious as ever" and "complex but strangely accessible".

== Musical style and influences ==
The band's music has been described as punk, and representative of a midwestern scene of egg punk bands, a subgenre of DIY punk bands influenced by DEVO. Similar to DEVO, the band employs narrative elements in the concept and packaging of their music, including the operations of the titular Club and the fictional National Pen Company and Sunbelt Chemical Corporation.

== Members ==
- Brendan Wells – Bass, vocals (2014-present)
- Harry Wohl – Guitar, vocals (2014-present)
- Ian Stemper ("Teen Man") – Guitar, vocals (2014-present)
- Matt Stagner – Drums, percussion (2014-present)

== Past Members ==
- Charles Free - Tape manipulation, sound effects (2013-2014)
- "Sci-fi" Sam Benson - Dancer, back-up vocals (2013-2014)

== Discography ==
=== Studio albums ===
- The Minneapolis Uranium Club Band Performs Human Exploration (2014)
- All of Them Naturals (2016)
- The Cosmo Cleaners: The Higher Calling of Business Provocateurs (2019)
- Infants Under The Bulb (2024)

=== Live albums ===
- Live! at Arci Taun! (2017)
