= Playing Favorites =

Playing Favorites may refer to:

- Playing Favorites (Michael Martin Murphey album), 2001
- Playing Favorites (10,000 Maniacs album), 2016
- Playing Favorites (Sheer Mag album), 2024
- The Playing Favorites, an American indie rock band formed in 2007
