= Jen Calleja =

British writer and translator

- Born: December 1986 (age 39)
- Education: Goldsmiths, University of London; University College London
- Occupations: Writer; literary translator

Jen Calleja (born December 1986) is a British writer and literary translator.

== Education ==
Calleja studied Media and Modern Literature at Goldsmiths (2006–09) followed by an MA in German Studies at UCL (2010–12), where she wrote her Masters dissertation on the poet-translator Michael Hofmann and the artist Gerhard Richter. Since 2012, she has been a freelance literary translator from German, and a published writer and poet.

== Career ==
In 2012 she founded the Anglo-German arts journal Verfreundungseffekt, and some years later became the acting editor of the journal New Books in German.

Her first collection as a poet, Serious Justice, published by Test Centre was shortlisted for the Melita Hume Poetry Prize 2015 and for the London Review of Books Bookshop Best Debut Selection 2016.

In 2017 Calleja was chosen as the inaugural Translator in Residence at the British Library. during which she aimed to explore "the range of theoretical, educational and practical facets of translation and their role in society and culture".

"The Pine Islands", Calleja's translation of Die Kieferninseln by Marion Poschmann, was shortlisted for the 2019 International Booker Prize. She has translated fiction and non-fiction for Bloomsbury, Faber & Faber, Fitzcarraldo Editions and Peirene Press and has written a column on literary translation for The Quietus. Her translations have been featured in The New Yorker and Literary Hub.

Her first collection of short stories, I'm Afraid that's All We've Got Time For, was published in 2020

Calleja, along with Kat Storace, founded Praspar Press in 2020. Praspar is a micro-press that publishes English translations of literature originally in Maltese. They have also published several anthologies featuring Maltese writers writing in English, writers of Maltese heritage, and further English translations of writing in Maltese.

In 2023, Calleja published the book-length poem Dust Sucker with Makina Poetry, as a bilingual edition also featuring a German translation by Carolina Schutti; it was reviewed by the Big Issue as "mesmeric."

Her next book, Fair: The Life-Art of Translation, a non-fiction release exploring the art of fiction translation, was published in 2025.

In an earlier life, Calleja played drums for Sauna Youth and Feature.

== Award nominations ==
- Shortlisted for the Man Booker International Prize 2019 for her translation of "The Pine Islands" by Marion Poschmann
- Shortlisted for the Schlegel-Tieck Prize 2018 for her translation of "Dance by the Canal" by Kerstin Hensel

== Bibliography ==
=== Selected translations ===
- Nicotine by Gregor Hens (Fitzcarraldo Editions, 2015)
- The Pine Islands by Marion Poschmann (Serpent's Tail, 2019)
- Dance by the Canal by Kerstin Hensel (Peirene Press, 2017)

=== Poetry ===
- Serious Justice (Test Centre, 2015)
- Dust Sucker (Makina, 2023)

=== Short stories ===
- I'm Afraid that's All We've Got Time For (Prototype Publishing, 2020)

=== Non-fiction ===
- Fair: The Life-Art of Translation (Prototype Publishing, 2025)

=== Fiction ===
- Vehicle: a verse novel (Prototype Publishing, 2023)
