= A Distant Call =

Studio album by Sheer Mag
- Released: August 23, 2019
- Genres: Heavy metal; power pop; protest music; punk rock; rock n' roll
- Length: 33:52
- Label: Wilsuns

Sheer Mag chronology
Need to Feel Your Love (2017)	A Distant Call (2019)	Playing Favorites (2024)

Singles from A Distant Call
- 1. "Blood from a Stone" Released: June 19, 2019; 2. "Hardly to Blame" Released: July 22, 2019; 3. "The Killer" Released: August 19, 2019

A Distant Call is the second studio album by American band Sheer Mag. It was released on August 23, 2019, through the band's own label; Wilsuns Recording Company.

The first single from the album, "Blood From A Stone," was released on June 19, 2019.

== Release and promotion ==
=== Singles ===
Three singles were released on A Distant Call which were released prior to the release of the album. The first single, "Blood From A Stone" was released on June 19, 2019, which coincided with the album's announcement. The second single, "Hardly to Blame", was released on July 22, 2019. The third, and final single from the album, "The Killer", came out on August 19, 2019.

== Critical reception ==
Professional ratings
Aggregate scores
Source	Rating
AnyDecentMusic?	7.3/10
Metacritic	81/100
Review scores
Source	Rating
AllMusic	4/5 stars
Consequence of Sound	B
Exclaim!	7/10
The Guardian	4/5 stars
NME	4/5 stars
Paste	8.5/10
Pitchfork	7.8/10
Q	4/5 stars
Rolling Stone	4/5 stars

A Distant Call was met with universal acclaim reviews from critics. At Metacritic, which assigns a weighted average rating out of 100 to reviews from mainstream publications, this release received an average score of 81, based on 12 reviews.

== Track listing ==
No.	Title	Length
1.	"Steel Sharpens Steel"	4:02
2.	"Blood From a Stone"	2:37
3.	"Unfound Manifest"	3:36
4.	"Silver Line"	3:25
5.	"Hardly to Blame"	3:07
6.	"Cold Sword"	3:29
7.	"Chopping Block"	2:32
8.	"The Right Stuff"	3:14
9.	"The Killer"	4:43
10.	"Keep On Runnin"	3:07
