= Need to Feel Your Love =

Studio album by Sheer Mag
- Released: July 6, 2017
- Recorded: Late 2016 to early 2017
- Genres: Punk; hard rock; rock and roll; garage rock; proto-metal; power pop; protest music; riot grrrl
- Length: 42:33
- Labels: Wilsuns; Static Shock
- Producer: Hart Seely

Sheer Mag chronology
Compilation (I, II & III) (2017)	Need to Feel Your Love (2017)	A Distant Call (2019)

Singles from Need to Feel Your Love
- 1. "Just Can't Get Enough" Released: May 10, 2017; 2. "Need to Feel Your Love" Released: June 6, 2017; 3. "Suffer Me" Released: June 30, 2017

Need to Feel Your Love is the debut studio album of Philadelphia punk group Sheer Mag. It was recorded in six months starting in the fall of 2016 and produced by Hart Seeley. It differs from previous records by the band for its cleaner sound and more dynamic tone. Lyrically, the album has both political songs and soul, funk, and disco-tinged love tracks.

Debuting on July 6, 2017 via streaming by NPR Music and on July 14, 2017 in other formats by the Wilsuns Recording Company and Static Shock Records, Need to Feel Your Love received acclaim from reviewers, some of them calling it one of the best LPs of 2017. Many critics highlighted its combination of different musical influences and the extension of Sheer Mag's musical range. However, the album was also criticized for being over-reliant on elements of old music. Need to Feel Your Love was included in the top 30 of year-end lists of publications such as Rolling Stone, NME, Spin, Slant Magazine, Noisey, and Paste.

== Background ==
Sheer Mag formed in 2014 and until 2017 had only been releasing seven-inch extended plays and singles. Band guitarist Kyle Seely wrote songs for a full-length album "in the background" during this period. The group waited a long time to record and release an album because, as band guitar Kyle Seely, "we didn't want to have one of those cop-out LPs that's, like, eight songs or something." Seely explained that the group changed how they wrote songs as time went on: "I don't want to say we dumbed down but sort of simplified stuff. Like, let's not take forever to write these riffs and not worry about it too much and lets just do a more of like you can predict where the song goes and it's satisfying in a different sense."

Need to Feel Your Love was recorded in six months starting in the fall of 2016. Singer Tina Hallady described making the LP as "a lot of pressure on ourselves. It was a stressful time for all of us, for a lot of different reasons: because of our new president, because we didn't want to fuck this up, self-doubt — straining our relationships by spending every day criticizing and working together." The band took on many challenges, such as Hallady having to sing in different octaves on each lines on "Expect the Bayonet" and having to write a calm song on "Until You Find the One."

== Composition ==
Following a fusion of hard rock, punk, and "classic rock" stylings, Need to Feel Your Love also touches on several genres such as pub rock, arena rock, new wave, soft rock, jangle rock, glam rock, art punk, 1980s indie music, funk, disco, blues rock, folk, and soul. The disco, funk, and soul elements are the most prominent on the LP's love-based tracks. Ben Salmon of Paste magazine analyzed that Halladay sings in a "combination of tenderness and tough talk" unusual for most punk music, singing louder on the album's political songs while calming down on the love-based material. As writer Jeremy Winograd described how her singing adds to the political aspect of the music, she "reclaim[s] variations on '70s-style hairy-chested horndog sentiments, whether set to indelible funk on the title track or whirling rock riffs on "Just Can't Get Enough," [that] endows them with a feminist edge."

Need to Feel Your Love has a more polished sound than previous Sheer Mag releases. This includes a decrease of lo-fi processing on Halladay's vocals, which came from producer and group bassist Hart Seely's mother saying she couldn't understand the words she was singing. The album's sound was compared by several critics to the works of Thin Lizzy and AC/DC. Need to Feel Your Love is more varied in mood than previous Sheer Mag releases. A NME writer described Need to Feel Your Love as showing Sheer Mag's more "tender side," noting elements of the works of Nile Rodgers and ABBA added to the group's style on the record.

Lyrically, Need to Feel Your Love is a protest album containing a mixture of both tracks following left-wing political beliefs and love songs. As DIY magazine summarized, "Far more simply, this record is mainly concerned with the power of being compassionate towards others, and extending love to everyone; friends and strangers alike. [...] As we've sadly seen from recent tragic events, sticking together and loving each other feels absolutely vital." "Suffer Me" deals with the legacy of the Stonewall riot, "(Say Goodbye To) Sophie Scholl" is a ballad about the titular anti-Nazi protester, and "Expect the Bayonet" and the title track regards racial inequality in the United States. Other politically tinged tracks include "Meet Me In The Street," a track inspired by Matt Palmer's experience at the DisruptJ20 protests in Washington, D.C. during Donald Trump's 2017 inauguration.

== Critical reception ==
Professional ratings
Aggregate scores
Source	Rating
AnyDecentMusic?	8.1/10
Metacritic	83/100
Review scores
Source	Rating
AllMusic	4/5 stars
The A.V. Club	B
The Guardian	5/5 stars
NME	5/5 stars
The Observer	2/5 stars
Pitchfork	8.0/10
Q	4/5 stars
Slant Magazine	4.5/5 stars
Uncut	7/10
Vice	A−

Need to Feel Your Love was critically acclaimed upon its release, some reviewers claiming it to be one of 2017's best albums. Need to Feel Your Love garnered five-star reviews from The Guardian, NME, and DIY. The Guardian writer Ben Beaumont-Thomas, in a five-star review, called Need to Feel Your Love one of the "most tenacious" records of 2017: "Sheer Mag give you everything – socially conscious, sexually confident rock'n'roll that nods to [several styles] and make it even more than the sum of its parts." NME claimed it "thwacks you right in the gut from the get go" and "energy, desire and that indefinable cool that any great rock band must have burst from every angle."

David Sackllah of Consequence of Sound described the group's handling of political subject matter as distinctive: "In an age where the bar for political music is so low that any indie-rock band writing a positive song about love filled with vague platitudes can sell it as an anti-Trump attack, the direct punch of Sheer Mag is refreshing." His only criticism was that the record "suffers slightly from the pacing issue of moving to a 12-song LP after mastering the EP format," where its "back half gets bogged down by some of the mid-tempo tracks, especially an out-of-character ballad ("Until You Find The One"), after burning through the tremendous highs of its first side."

Tiny Mix Tapes writer Leah B. Levinson called it "propulsive and provides evidence to the talk that a guitar band in 2017 can be a source of ingenuity without pulling excessive tricks and mutations upon the craft." She elaborated that its charm is that it is "not flashy or excessive, but it is indeed better than anyone asked for it to be." AllMusic writer Tim Sendra praised Need to Feel Your Love as "just good old-fashioned hard rock that's guilt free and easy to love" without any "toxic masculinity" to worry about. He as well as other critics spotlighted the stylistic variety between songs, Sendra writing "There's more than one way to rock, and Sheer Mag do their best to find as many ways as possible."

Some reviewers honored the LP for broadening the dynamics of the band's music while maintaining their original sound, which Selmon opined Sheer Mag was "tricky" task. Some praised it for how it combined Sheer Mag's several influences (even those that shouldn't work together) to create something unique and relevant in the present day, one reviewer comparing this technique favorably to the works of The Hold Steady. However, Levinson was more mixed on the album exploring new styles for the band, reasoning that it was sometimes "over-considered." The A.V. Club praised the addition of themes about complicated relationships on an otherwise "rowd[y]" record, reasoning that they gave it a "poignant emotional depth."

The improved fidelity of Need to Feel Your Love and how it complemented Hallady's singing was also spotlighted in several reviews. However, it was criticized in a review by Bekki Bemrose, a writer for musicOMH, who felt the cleaner sound removed the "raw and raucous energy" of the band's past records. He also felt some of the album's messages weren't executed properly because the group "relies too heavily on retro stylings." The Line of Best Fit was another publication that panned the record's over-reliance on its elements of old music. Under the Radar also gave the LP a mixed review, primarily disliking its overly long length. A review in The Observer called the album "unlistenable," putting the blame on Halladay's vocals for the record being "one-dimensional" despite having elements from a diverse set of styles musically.

== Year-end list rankings ==
Publication	Rank
AllMusic	*
AllMusic (Rock)	*
Blare	38
Crack Magazine	28
Earbuddy	36
Exclaim! (Pop and Rock)	17
Flood Magazine	8
Louder than War	31
Noisey	11
NME	21
Paste	6
Rolling Stone	22
Rolling Stone Australia	22
Slant Magazine	6
Spin	14
Thrillist	26
Treble	40
Uproxx	29
"*" indicates an unordered list.

== Track listing ==
Derived from Sheer Mag's Official Bandcamp Page.

No.	Title	Length
1.	"Meet Me in the Street"	3:11
2.	"Need to Feel Your Love"	4:01
3.	"Just Can't Get Enough"	2:51
4.	"Expect the Bayonet"	3:45
5.	"Rank and File"	2:55
6.	"Turn It Up"	3:59
7.	"Suffer Me"	4:04
8.	"Pure Desire"	3:30
9.	"Until You Find the One"	1:54
10.	"Milk and Honey"	4:19
11.	"Can't Play It Cool"	3:48
12.	"(Say Goodbye To) Sophie Scholl"	4:16
Total length:		42:33

== Personnel ==
Derived from Sheer Mag's Official Bandcamp Page and The Fader.

- Music by Sheer Mag
  - Vocals by Tina Halladay
  - Lyrics, rhythm guitar and keyboards by Matt Palmer
  - Compositions and bass guitar by Kyle Seely
  - Arrangements, production, lead guitar, and vocals by Hart Seely
  - Drums by Cameron Wisch
- Mixed by Hunter Davidsohn at Business District Recordings in Johnson City, New York
- Mastered by Josh Bonati at Bonati Mastering in New York City

== Release history ==
Region	Date	Format(s)	Label
Worldwide	July 6, 2017	Streaming	NPR Music
Worldwide	July 14, 2017	Digital download; vinyl	Wilsuns (self-released)
Worldwide	July 14, 2017	CD	Static Shock
