= Ubik (band) =

Australian punk and punk rock band

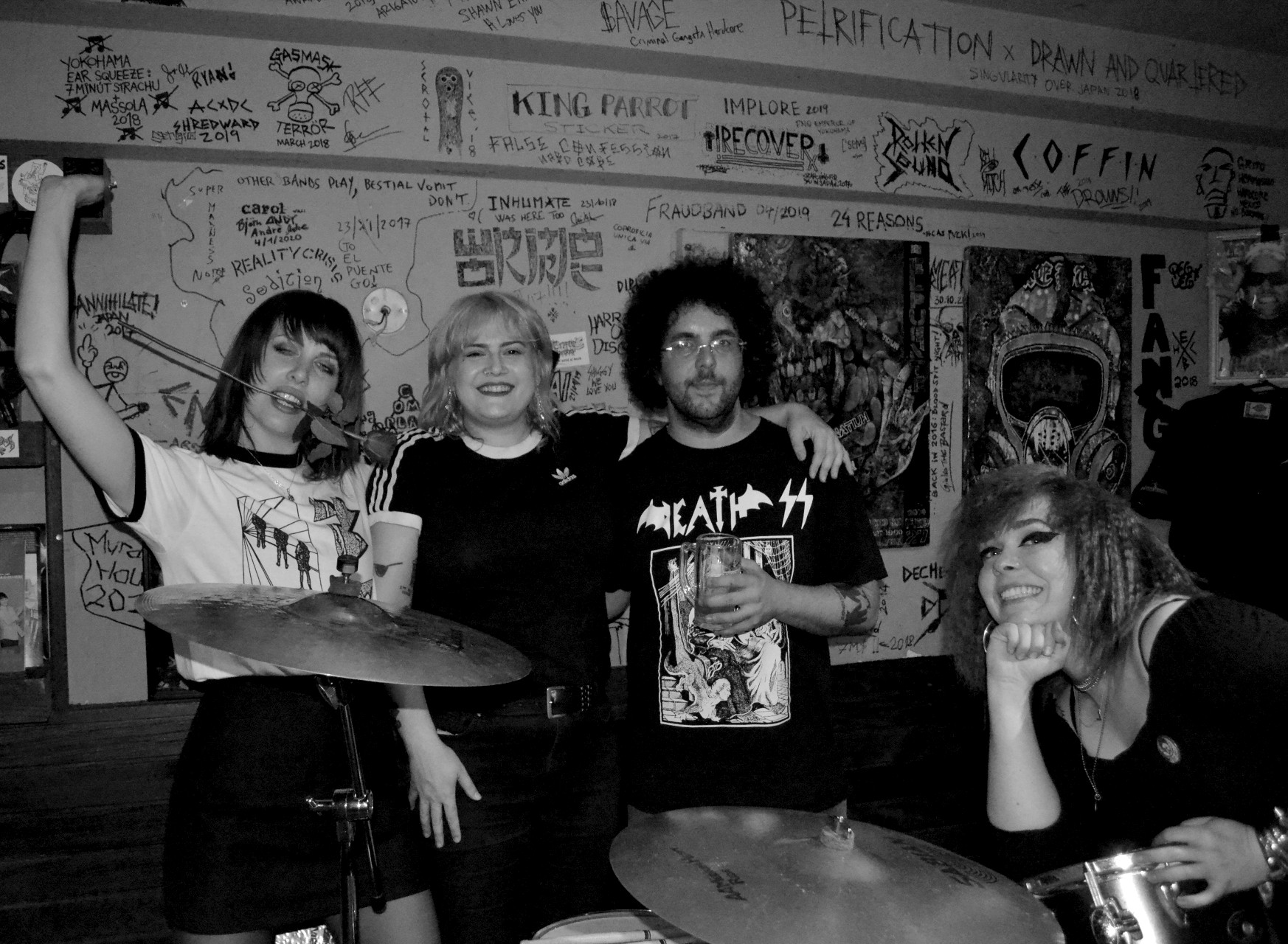
- Ubik in 2020

Background information
- Origin: Melbourne, Victoria
- Genres: Punk; post-punk
- Years active: 2016–2017, 2018–present
- Members: Ashleigh Wyatt; Tessa Tribe; Nellie Pearson; Max Kohane
- Past members: Chris Simpson

Ubik are an Australian punk and punk rock band from Melbourne.

== History ==
Ubik started as the side project of members from the band Masses, guitarist Tessa Tribe, bassist Nellie Pearson, and vocalist Ashleigh "Ash" Wyatt. The original lineup also included drummer Chris Simpson, who was introduced by Pearson. They released the singles "Piece of Mind" and "Andrew Bolts Twitter Account" on December 3, 2016, the latter named after Australian conservative commentator Andrew Bolt that, according to Vice, "explores the dangerous paranoia and social fear and mistrust that conservative columnists and broadcasters can breed." They released their first extended play Demo on December 9, 2016.

On January 20, 2018, they released the self-titled EP Ubik, which includes the song "The Fly" named after the movie of the same name. , On May 5, 2018, they released a collaboration EP with the band Cold Meat called Ubik / Cold Meat Split, where they covered X's song "Nausea" from their debut album Los Angeles.

On September 27, 2019, the band released their debut album Next Phase after a brief hiatus. The album had a launch event that included Vampire, Bitumen and The Uglies, but the event was met with sound issues. Daniel Lupton of Sorry State Records called it a "very riffing and melodic, but also a little aggressive."

== Members ==
- Ashleigh "Ash" Wyatt – vocals
- Tessa Tribe – guitar
- Nellie Pearson – bass and vocals
- Max Kohane – drums

=== Former ===
- Chris Simpson – drums (2016)

== Discography ==
=== Albums ===
Title	EP details
Next Phase MLP	Released: August 21, 2019; Label: Iron Lung; Format: Digital download, streaming, cassette

=== Extended plays ===
Title	EP details
Demo	Released: December 9, 2016; Label: Lost in Fog Records; Format: Digital download, streaming, cassette
Self Titled EP	Released: January 20, 2018; Label: Symphony of Destruction/Aarght Records; Format: Digital download, streaming, cassette
Ubik / Cold Meat Split	Released: May 9, 2018; Label: Lost in Fog Records/Helta Skelta Records; Format: Digital download, streaming, cassette
