= Normil Hawaiians =

English post-punk and experimental rock band

- Origin: Orpington, South London, England
- Genres: Post-punk; Experimental rock; Punk rock; Art punk
- Years active: 1979–1986, 2014–present
- Labels: Dining Out, Red Rhino, Illuminated Records, Upset The Rhythm
- Members: Guy Smith; Simon Marchant; Noel Blanden; Wilf Williams; Jimmy Miller; Zinta Egle
- Past members: Janet Armstrong; Kev Armstrong; Jim Lusted; Brian Kealy; Nick Rose; Mark Tyler; Alun Williams

Normil Hawaiians are an English post-punk and experimental rock band formed in Orpington, South London, in late 1979. With their fluid lineup, the band released two studio albums in the 1980s before disbanding in 1986. Following an archival reissue campaign initiated by the independent label Upset The Rhythm in the 2010s, the band reformed and released their fourth studio album, Empires into Sand, in 2024.

== History ==
=== Formation and early releases (1979–1981) ===
The band was formed in late 1979 by vocalist Guy Smith alongside a collective of local South London musicians including guitarists Jim Lusted and Kev Armstrong, vocalist Janet Armstrong, bassist Colin Donaldson, and drummer Chris Westerman. Their debut 7-inch single, "The Beat Goes On" / "Ventilation", was released in October 1980 on the Dining Out Records label and reached number 44 on the UK Independent Chart.

In May 1980, the band recorded a radio session for John Peel on BBC Radio 1, produced by Bob Sargeant. The lineup for the session featured new members Nick Rose on bass and Brian Kealy on drums. In November 1980, the group recorded material at Mousehole Studio in Orpington, released in 1981 as the 12-inch EP Gala Failed on Red Rhino Records. The EP featured poet Bertie Marshall on guest vocals for the track "Sang Sang".

Later in 1981, the band released the 7-inch single "Still Obedient" / "Should You Forget?" on Illuminated Records, recorded at Rhino Studios in Dorking. Following Janet Armstrong's departure to pursue solo work, multi-instrumentalist Simon Marchant, drummer Noel Blanden, and keyboardist/flautist Mark Tyler joined the band.

=== Studio albums and communal period (1982–1986) ===
In 1982, Normil Hawaiians shifted toward expansive, tape-loop-driven experimental music and Krautrock structures. They recorded their debut double studio album, More Wealth Than Money, at Foel Studio in Wales with engineer Dave Anderson (formerly of Hawkwind and Amon Düül II). Released in January 1983 through Illuminated Records, the album received retrospective critical acclaim for its blend of dark psychedelia and art-punk.

By 1984, the band members were living communally in South London squats. Their second studio album, What's Going On?, was released in 1984 by Illuminated Records. The album incorporated industrial noise, dub arrangements, and extended explorations of eastern modal music.

In 1985 and 1986, the band returned to Foel Studio to record their third album, Return of the Ranters, inspired by the 17th-century radical political movements of the English Civil War. Due to financial difficulties, the closure of Illuminated Records, and member departures, the album was shelved and the group disbanded in 1986.

=== Archival rediscoveries and reformation (2014–present) ===
In 2015, London-based independent label Upset The Rhythm unreleased and issued the 1986 sessions as Return of the Ranters. The label subsequently reissued expanded editions of More Wealth Than Money (2017), What's Going On? (2019), and the early singles compilation Dark World (79-81) (2022).

Core members Guy Smith and Simon Marchant reformed the band for live performances, including appearances at Cafe OTO and the Edinburgh Festival. In May 2024, Normil Hawaiians released Empires into Sand, their first album of new material in 40 years.

== Discography ==
=== Studio albums ===
Year	Release Details	Tracklist	Personnel & Label Credits
1983	More Wealth Than Money: Released: January 1983; Label: Illuminated Records (JAMS 23); Formats: 2×LP	Side A: Red Harvest / British Warm / Yellow Rain Side B: New Standard / An Old Standard / Other Ways Of Knowing; Side C: Words Are Not Enough / Return Of Hollow Lands / Ha Ha, The Story Of A Sunken Fence / Sally IV Side D: Left Alone With Her Pipe / Travelling West	Personnel: Guy Smith, Mark Tyler, Noel Blanden, Simon Merchant. Guest: Klaus Haare (cello). Engineer: Dave Anderson. Label: Illuminated Records.
1984	What's Going On?: Released: 1984; Label: Illuminated Records (JAMS 38); Formats: LP	Side A: Quiet Village / Martin / Slaves / Louise Michel / Ignorance Is Strength - I Feel So Worried / Big Lies / South Atlantic; Side B: Going Down / Market Place / Free Tibet	Personnel: Guy Smith, Simon Merchant, Mark Tyler, Noel Blanden, Alun Williams. Guest: Sue Leeves (spoken word). Label: Illuminated Records.
2015	Return of the Ranters: Recorded: 1985–1986; Released: 11 May 2015; Label: Upset The Rhythm (UTR 076); Formats: LP, CD, Digital	Sianne Don't Work In A Factory / The History Of Coal / Slums Still Stand / The Search For Um Gris / Sléibhte Macalla / The Battle Of Stonehenge / Piton De La Fournaise / Steam / Mouldwarp's Journey / The Fog	Personnel: Guy Smith, Alun Williams, Simon Marchant, Noel Blanden. Guest: Julie Wareing (fiddle). Label: Upset The Rhythm.
2024	Empires into Sand: Released: 24 May 2024; Label: Upset The Rhythm (UTR 163); Formats: LP, CD, Digital	Exiles / Ghosts of Ballochroy / Waves NR728524 / Back Home to the Stars / Waterfalls / Bedford 330 / We Stand Together / Big City Sky / In The Stone (Luddenham Mix) / North Atlantic	Personnel: Guy Smith, Simon Marchant (producer), Noel Blanden, Wilf Williams, Jimmy Miller, Mark Tyler, Zinta Egle. Guests: Rodney Relax, George Bikandy. Label: Upset The Rhythm.

=== EPs ===
Year	Release Details	Tracklist	Personnel & Label Credits
1980	Normil Hawaiians (& Berlin): Released: 1980; Label: Corporation Cassettes (CORP three); Formats: Cassette	Collaborative cassette release.	Personnel: Guy Smith, Jim Lusted, Brian Kealy, Nick Rose. Label: Corporation Cassettes.
1981	Gala Failed: Released: February 1981; Label: Red Rhino Records (RED 8); Formats: 12" EP	Side A: Party Party / Levels Of Water; Side B: Obedience / The Return / Sang Sang	Personnel: Guy Smith, James Lusted, Brian Kealy, Nick Rose. Guest: Bertie Marshall (vocals on "Sang Sang"). Producers: Guy Smith, James Lusted, Kev Armstrong, Pete Leggett. Label: Red Rhino Records.

=== Commercial Singles ===
Year	Release Details	Tracklist	Personnel & Label Credits
1980	"The Beat Goes On": Released: October 1980; Label: Dining Out Records (TUX 13); Formats: 7" Single	Side A: The Beat Goes On; Side B: Ventilation	Personnel: Guy Smith, Jim Lusted, Kev Armstrong, Janet Armstrong, Colin Donaldson, Chris Westerman. Label: Dining Out Records.
1981	"Still Obedient": Released: 1981; Label: Illuminated Records (ILL 7); Formats: 7" Single	Side A: Still Obedient; Side B: Should You Forget?	Personnel: Guy Smith, Jim Lusted, Kev Armstrong. Recorded at: Rhino Studios, Dorking. Label: Illuminated Records.
2020	"In The Stone / Where Is Living?": Released: 16 September 2020; Label: Upset The Rhythm (UTR 134); Formats: 7" Single	Side A: In The Stone; Side B: Where Is Living?	Personnel: Guy Smith, Simon Marchant, Zinta Egle. Label: Upset The Rhythm.
