= Kitchen's Floor =

Australian rock band from Brisbane

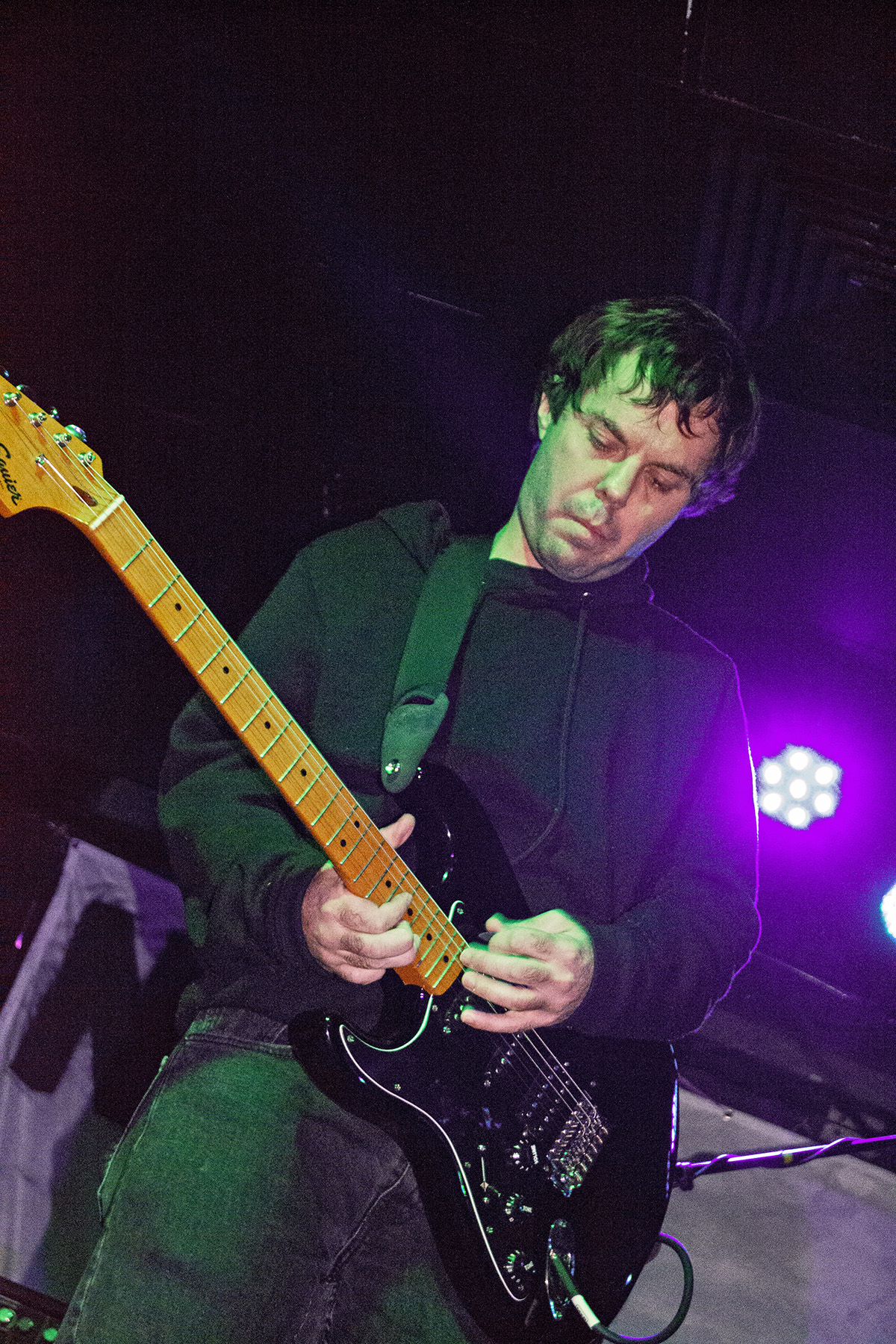
Matt Kennedy of Kitchen's Floor playing live at Nag Nag Nag Fest 2023, Sydney, Australia.

Kitchen's Floor is an Australian independent alternative rock band from Brisbane, Queensland. Known for their raw and lo-fi sound, Kitchen's Floor has gained a dedicated following in the underground music scene since their inception in 2007. Their music has been released on labels Siltbreeze, Negative Guest List, R.I.P Society, Quemada, Bedroom Suck Records, Bruit Direct Disques, HoZac Records, Petty Bunco, and Eternal Soundcheck.

== History ==
The band was founded by Matt Kennedy (vocals, guitar) in 2007. Kennedy's pre-Kitchen's Floor band was mid-2000s band, Look! Pond. Kitchen's Floor started as a DIY project, self-recording. The band is essentially Kennedy's solo project and has had a revolving door of members over the years.

In late 2007, Kennedy was asked to play a solo set at Yvonne Ruve in Sydney, and needed a name for the event poster, he didn't want to use his own name so he came up with the name, Kitchen's Floor.

Kennedy is known for making direct, simple, honest music that reflect his immediate surroundings, with his everyday life in Brisbane featuring heavily in Kitchen's Floor songs. Most Kitchen's Floor songs are written on an acoustic guitar.

In 2009, Kitchen's Floor released their debut album, Loneliness is A Dirty Mattress. At the time the band were ground zero for Brisbane's underground music community. The influence of Loneliness... inspired several other bands, plus a mini-festival Deadshits.

The cover for Kitchen's Floor's sophomore album, Look Forward To Nothing, is a photo of Kennedy sitting in his share-house room nursing a hangover. The share-house also hosted many DIY house shows, integral to the Brisbane music community of the time, bands such as Blank Realm, Cured Pink, Bed Wettin’ Bad Boys and Royal Headache played. The house also features in Kitchen's Floor music videos for songs, ‘Left‘ was filmed downstairs in the laundry, ‘116‘ was filmed in the backyard and ‘Bitter Defeat’ was filmed in the lounge room. Their video for song 'Resident Dregs' was shot at a storage facility in West End, it was their first film clip not shot at Kennedy's house.

Kitchen's Floor has toured extensively. In 2011, the band toured across the United States playing 30 shows. In 2015, they toured the UK and Europe. Kitchen's Floor toured New Zealand in 2016.

Between their 2015 album, Battle For Brisbane, and their 2022 album, None Of That, Kennedy suffered writer's block. None Of That was written during the global COVID-19 pandemic, with Kennedy playing all instruments on the album. None Of That was named Brisbane radio station 4ZZZ's Album Of The Week on 28 November 2022, the album was recorded by Blank Realm's Luke Walsh.

Kitchen's Floor appeared on the cover of Australian print music magazine, The Stew, in August 2022.

== Members ==
Current members

- Matt Kennedy- Vocals, Guitar
- Pat Shark - Drums
- Phoebe Bétrémieux - Bass

Past Members

- Andrew McLellan - Organ
- Robert Vagg - Drums
- Josh Watson - Bass / Violin
- Liam Kenny - Bass
- Joe Alexander - Drums
- Glen Schenau - Bass
- Mitch Perkins - Bass
- Julia Norris - Drums / Vocal
- Alen Nguyen - Drums

== Discography ==
Albums

Title	Details
Loneliness Is A Dirty Mattress	Released: August 15, 2009; Label: R.I.P Society Records
Look Forward To Nothing	Released: October 17, 2011; Label: Bedroom Suck Records
Live In Brisbane	Released: August 21, 2012; Label: Quemada; Note: Originally released on cassette as Too Dead To Notice by Negative Guest List on March 17, 2011
Battle Of Brisbane	Released: September 7, 2015; Label: Bruit Direct Disques, HoZac & Eternal Soundcheck
None Of That	Released: November 25, 2022; Label: Petty Bunco & Eternal Soundcheck

7” Singles

Title	Details
Regrets	Released: February 25, 2010; Label: R.I.P. Society Records
Deadshits	Released: July 1, 2008; Label: Eternal Soundcheck & Paradise Daily
Bitter Defeat / Down	Released: September 18, 2012; Label: Negative Guest List Records
