= Static Shock Records =

- Founded: 2008
- Founder: Tom Ellis
- Genre: Punk; Hardcore; Post Punk; Garage Punk
- Country of origin: United Kingdom
- Location: London
- Official website: https://staticshockrecords.limitedrun.com/ https://staticshockrecords.bandcamp.com/ https://staticshockrecords.blogspot.com/

Static Shock Records is an English independent record label, gig promoter, and distributor specialising in underground punk founded in London in 2008. From 2012 to 2023 the label organised a 'Static Shock Weekend' festival most years, held at different venues around the city.

== History ==
Static Shock was founded in London by Tom Ellis in 2008. Its first release was a 7” from the Canadian power pop band Dangerloves, after seeing the band play at Toronto's Fucked Up Weekend, now called Not Dead Yet Fest. The label's next release was a 7” from his own band, The Shitty Limits, called Here Are The Limits. The label has since released music by bands from all over Europe, North America, and Australia.

Since 2012 the label has organised the 'Static Shock Weekend' festival most years at different venues in the city. Bands to play the festival include Iron Lung, Pharmakon, Limp Wrist, Sauna Youth, and Sheer Mag. On 6 July 2023 the label announced they would stop putting these on after a final festival the coming September.

== Acclaimed releases ==
Debuting on 6 July 2017 via streaming by NPR Music and physically released 14 July 2017 in a co-release with the Wilsuns Recording Company, Static Shock Records released Need To Feel Your Love by Sheer Mag. It received acclaim from reviewers, some of them calling it one of the best LPs of 2017.

Need To Feel Your Love was included in the top 30 of year-end lists of publications such as Rolling Stone, NME, Spin, Slant Magazine, Noisey, and Paste.

On 19 October 2018 the label released Raise Your Voice Joyce: Contemporary Shouts From Contemporary Voices, a compilation of music covertly recorded by the Canadian band Fucked Up, though uncredited, with lyrics and vocals performed by members of UK and European punk bands including Nekra, Good Throb, Arms Race, Sauna Youth, Terrible Feelings, and more.

In January 2020 the label released Speed Kills, the debut album by punk-indebted pub rock band Chubby and the Gang. It quickly received positive reviews from the likes of Rolling Stone, Pitchfork and Stereogum.

== Artists on Static Shock Records ==
- Ajax
- Alvilda
- AMMO
- ASSISTERT SJØLMORD
- ATAQUE ZERO
- Beta Blockers
- Blazing Eye
- Bootlicker
- Career Suicide
- Chubby and the Gang
- Cold Meat
- Creem
- Dangerloves
- DELCO MF'S
- Disguise
- Efialtis
- Frau
- GLAAS
- GOLPE
- Hygiene
- Idiota Civilizzato
- Impalers
- Imploders
- Krimewatch
- KORO
- LASSO
- L.O.T.I.O.N
- The Love Triangle
- LUCTA
- Music City
- Nasti
- Negative Gears
- Neutrals
- No
- The Number Ones
- Oily Boys
- Perspex Flesh
- Powerplant
- Sarcasm
- Sauna Youth
- Sievehead
- Sheer Mag
- S.H.I.T.
- The Shitty Limits
- Stigmatism
- Strutter
- The Flex
- The Hazmats
- TV Crime
- Tyrannamen
- Uranium Club
- Urban Blight
- Violent Future
- Violent Reaction
- Warthog
- White Collar
- Young Governor
