= The True Story of Bananagun =

Studio album by Bananagun
- Released: 26 June 2020
- Length: 40:33
- Label: AntiFade, Full Time Hobby

Singles from The True Story of Bananagun
- 1. "Out of Reach" Released: 5 December 2019; 2. "People Talk Too Much" Released: 22 April 2020; 3. "The Master" Released: 3 June 2020

The True Story of Bananagun is the debut studio album by Australian band Bananagun. It was released on 26 June 2020 and debuted at number 40 on the ARIA Charts.

== Critical reception ==
Professional ratings
Aggregate scores
Source	Rating
AnyDecentMusic?	7.6/10
Metacritic	83/100
Review scores
Source	Rating
AllMusic	3.5/5 stars
Beats Per Minute	81%
Clash	8/10
Exclaim!	8/10
The Line of Best Fit	7/10
Loud and Quiet	9/10
Mojo	4/5 stars
NME	4/5 stars
Uncut	9/10

The True Story of Bananagun was met with "universal acclaim" reviews from critics. At Metacritic, which assigns a weighted average rating out of 100 to reviews from mainstream publications, this release received an average score of 83, based on 9 reviews. Aggregator Album of the Year gave the album 81 out of 100 based on a critical consensus of 10 reviews.

== Track listing ==
The True Story of Bananagun track listing
No.	Title	Length
1.	"Bang Go The Bongos"	3:25
2.	"The Master"	4:21
3.	"People Talk Too Much"	6:42
4.	"Freak Machine"	3:40
5.	"Bird Up!"	1:30
6.	"Out of Reach"	5:17
7.	"She Now"	3:23
8.	"Perfect Stranger"	3:02
9.	"Mushroom Bomb"	3:44
10.	"Modern Day Problems"	2:54
11.	"Taking the Present for Granted"	2:35

== Charts ==
Chart performance for The True Story of Bananagun
Chart (2020)	Peak position
Australian Albums (ARIA)	40

== Release history ==
Region	Date	Format	Label	Catalogue
Australia	26 June 2020	CD; digital download; streaming; LP	AntiFade records	ANT-070
UK & Europe	26 June 2020	CD; digital download; streaming; LP	Full Time Hobby	FTH378LP
