= Bananagun =

Australian music group

- Origin: Australia
- Years active: 2016–present
- Labels: Anti Fade Records; Full Time Hobby
- Members: Nick Van Bakel; Jimi Gregg; Jack Crook; Charlotte Tobin; Josh Dans
- Website: www.bananagunoz.com

Bananagun are an Australian music group. They released their debut studio album in June 2020.

== Band members ==
Current members

- Nick Van Bakel (multi-instrumentalist)
- Jimi Gregg (drums)
- Jack Crook (guitar)
- Charlotte Tobin (djembe/percussion)
- Joshua Dans (bass)

== Career ==
=== 2016–present: The True Story of Bananagun ===
Originally Nick Van Bakel's solo recording project, Bananagun's members have grown into a five-piece, born out of fellow psych-rockers The Frowning Clouds, also fronted by Van Bakel.

The band released their debut double-A sided single "Do Yeah"/"Top Cat" in February 2019.

In April 2020, the band announced the release of their debut studio album, The True Story of Bananagun for 26 June 2020. In July, the album debuted at number 40 on the ARIA Charts. While reviewing their debut album in the New Yorker, Jay Ruttenberg said that Bananagun "bears the hallmarks of one of the sundry sixties acts whose work slipped through the cracks of time, only to be salvaged, decades later, by sharp-eared record collectors."

== Discography ==
=== Albums ===
List of albums, with selected chart positions
| Title | Album details | Peak chart positions |
| Title | Album details | AUS |
|---|---|---|
| The True Story of Bananagun | Released: 26 June 2020; Label: Anti Fade Records; Formats: CD, digital download, streaming | 40 |
| Why Is the Colour of the Sky? | Released: 8 November 2024 | |

=== Singles ===
List of singles, with year released and selected chart positions and certifications shown
| Title | Year | Album |
|---|---|---|
| "Do Yeah"/"Top Cat" | 2019 | non album single |
| "Out of Reach" | 2019 | The True Story of Bananagun |
| "People Talk to Much" | 2020 | The True Story of Bananagun |
| "The Master" | 2020 | The True Story of Bananagun |
| "Day by Day" | 2025 | Non album single |
