= Sheer Mag =

American rock band

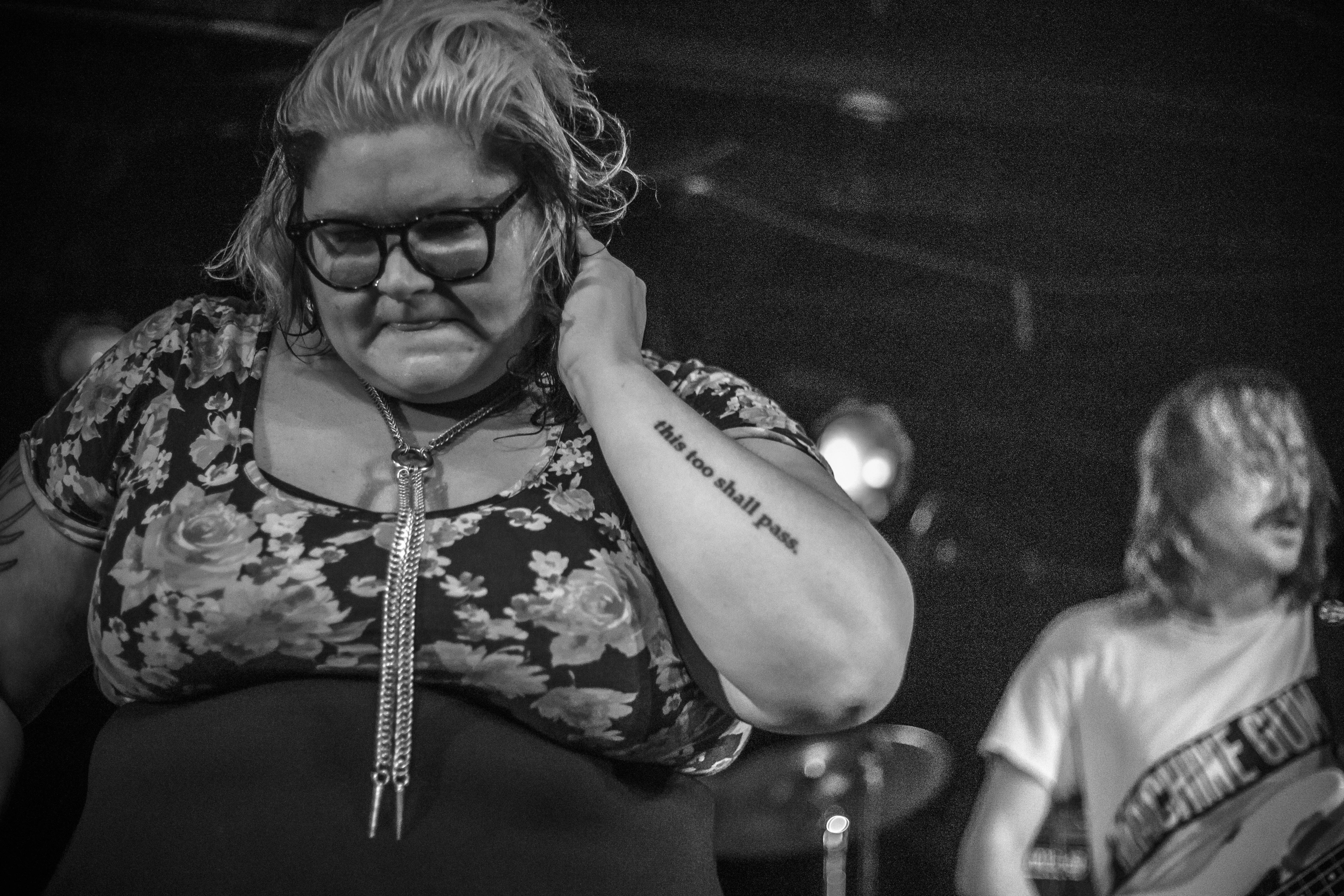

Background information
- Origin: Philadelphia, Pennsylvania
- Genres: Punk rock, hard rock, power pop
- Years active: 2014–present
- Labels: Wilsuns RC, Static Shock Records, Third Man
- Members: Tina Halladay; Matt Palmer; Kyle Seely; Hart Seely
- Past members: Allen Chapman; Ian Dykstra; Cameron Wisch
- Website: sheer-mag.com

Sheer Mag is an American rock band from Philadelphia formed in 2014. A combination of 1970s rock and punk ethos, the band self-released three 7-inch EPs before March 2016. They have released three studio albums; 2017's Need To Feel Your Love, 2019's A Distant Call, and 2024's Playing Favorites.

== History ==
Sheer Mag's core members—Christina Halladay, Matt Palmer, and siblings Kyle and Hart Seely—all met while studying at SUNY Purchase. After graduating they all moved to Philadelphia and formed the band in 2014. They all moved into a house together, referring to their home as 'The Nuthouse', where they recorded their debut self-titled 7-inch EP later that year. It was released on their own label, Wilsons RC, in September 2014.

Following its positive reception they went on their first full U.S. tour the next spring, with their EP finding a UK/EU release with London punk label Static Shock Records - a relationship that would continue for future releases.

In January 2015, Rolling Stone featured the band as one of "10 New Artists You Need To Know", describing them as "a gang of punks with a not-so-secret love of Seventies classic rock." They released their second EP in April 2015, this time a co-release with Brooklyn label Katorga Works.

In March 2016 they released a third 7-inch vinyl EP.

In 2016, the band was part of the Coachella 2016 line-up and performed on Late Night with Seth Meyers.

In early 2017 Wilsons RC and Static Shock released a compilation LP covering all songs from their previous releases.

On May 10, 2017, Sheer Mag released the title track off their first full-length record, Need to Feel Your Love, which came out 14 July.

On June 19, 2019, they announced their second LP, A Distant Call would be released on August 23 the same year.

The track "Expect the Bayonet" from Need to Feel Your Love served as the walkout track for Bernie Sanders at a comeback presidential campaign rally in Queens, New York during October 2019. The RollingStone politics podcast Useful Idiots uses the same track as its theme music.

In August 2023, the band signed with Third Man Records and shared their first new song in four years, "All Lined Up". Their third album, Playing Favorites, was released on March 1, 2024.

== Members ==
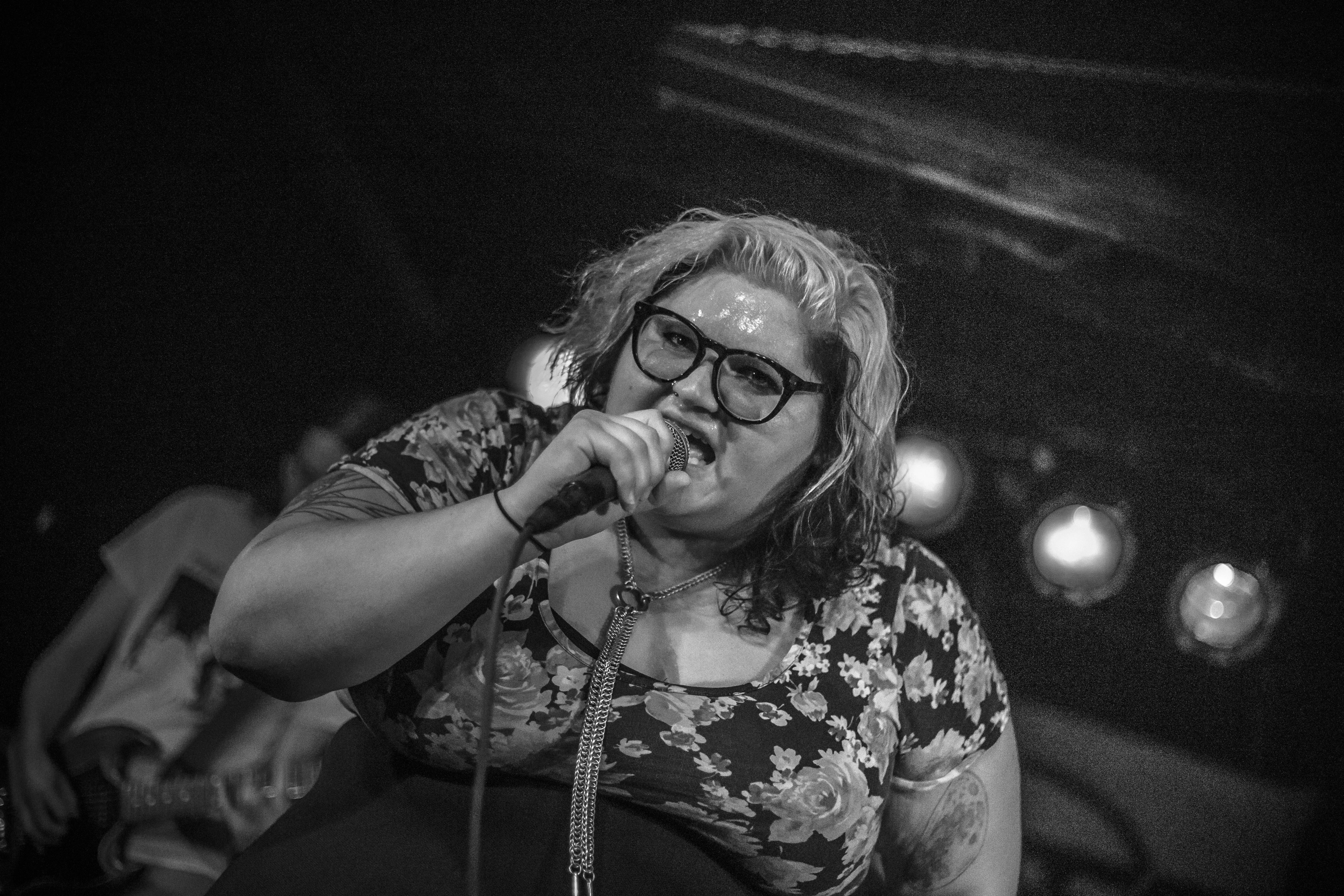
Christina Halladay

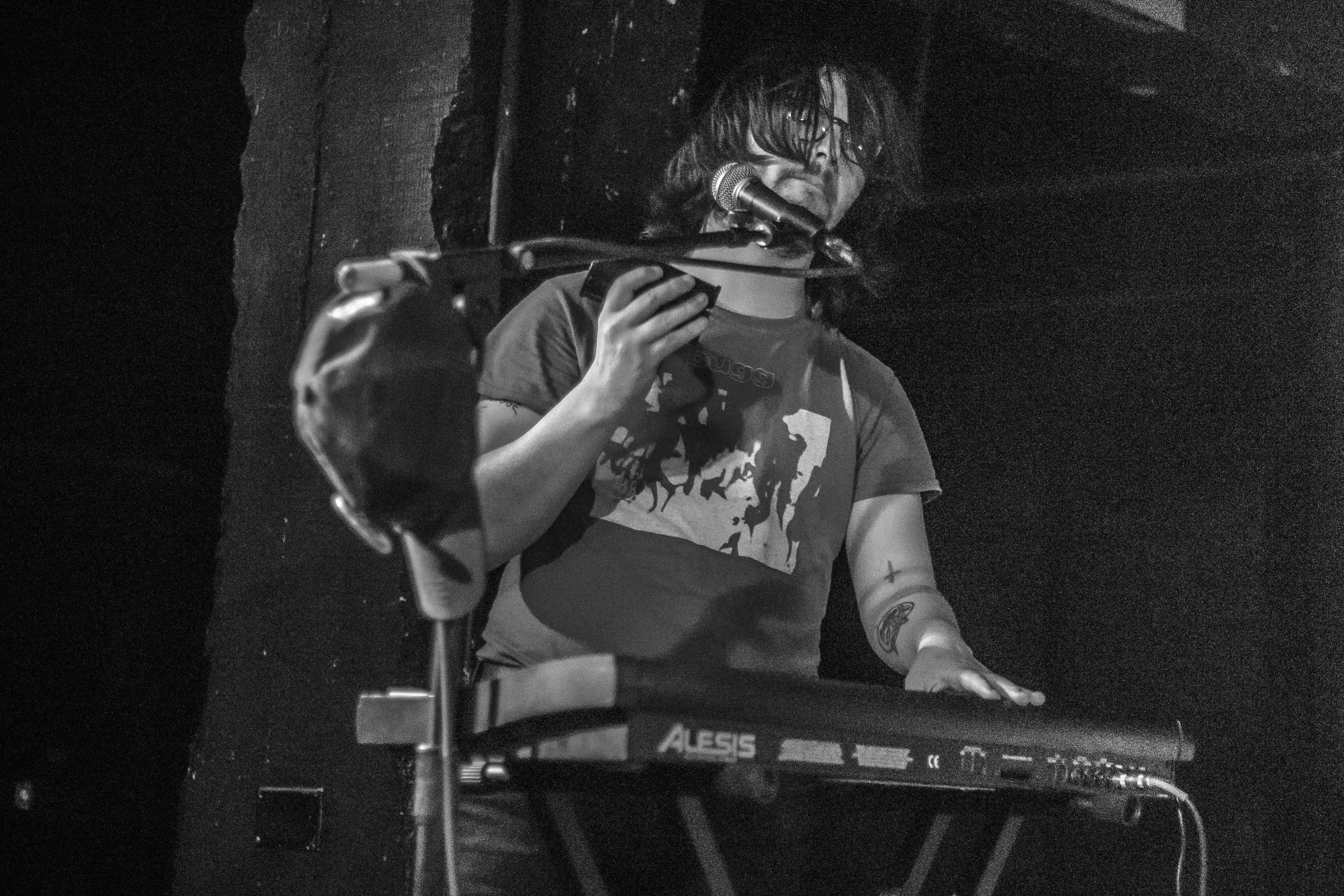
Matt Palmer

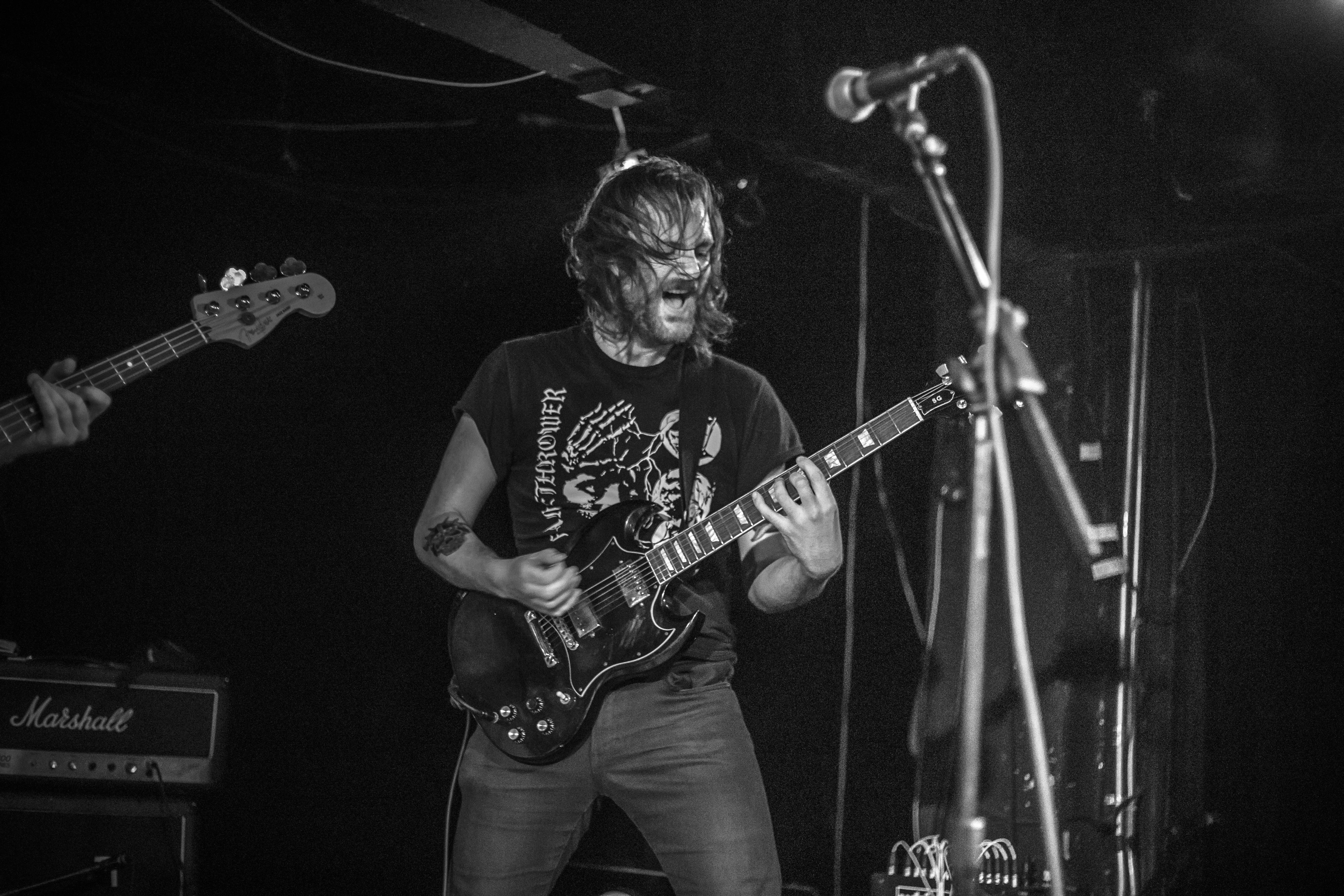
Kyle Seely

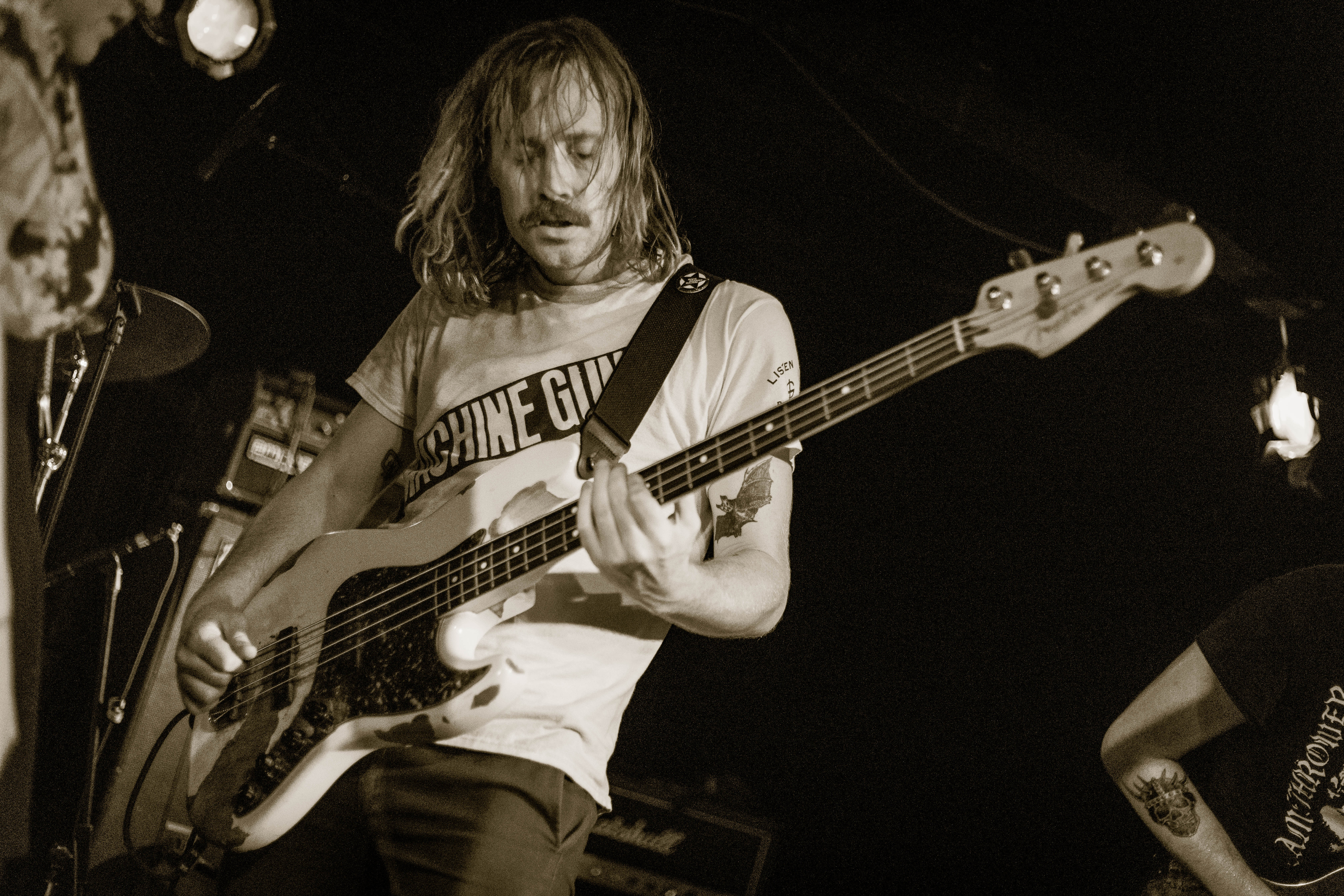
Hart Seely

=== Current members ===
- Christina Halladay – lead vocals (2014–present)
- Matt Palmer – rhythm guitar, keyboards (2014–present)
- Kyle Seely – lead guitar, backing vocals (2014–present), drums (2019–present; studio only)
- Hart Seely – bass (2014–present)

==== Current touring musicians ====
- Evan Campbell – drums (2023–present)

=== Past members ===
- Ian Dykstra – drums (2014–2015, 2016–2017)
- Allen Chapman – drums (2015)
- Cameron Wisch – drums (2017)
- Giacomo Zatti – drums (2017–2023; touring)

== Discography ==
=== Studio albums ===
- Need to Feel Your Love (Wilsuns Recording Company / Static Shock, 2017)
- A Distant Call (Wilsuns Recording Company, 2019)
- Playing Favorites (Third Man Records, 2024)

=== EPs ===
- I (Wilsuns Recording Company / Static Shock, 2015)
- II (Wilsuns Recording Company / Katorga Works / Static Shock, 2015)
- III (Wilsuns Recording Company / Static Shock, 2016)

=== Compilation albums ===
- Compilation (I, II & III) (Wilsuns Recording Company / Static Shock / Get Better, 2017)

=== Live albums ===
- Live! (Shout Recordings, 2019)
