= Peepholes (band) =

British musical duo

Peepholes were a British musical duo made up of Nick Carlisle and Katia Barrett. They formed in Brighton around 2007/8 and released the albums Caligula (2011) and The Overspill! (2012) on Upset the Rhythm.

== Discography ==
=== Albums ===
- a.P.A.t.T. / Peepholes (Upset the Rhythm, 2010) – split with APAtT
- Caligula (Upset! The Rhythm, 2011)
- The Overspill! (Upset! The Rhythm, 2012)

=== EPs ===
- Lair (Hungry For Power, 2010)

== See also ==
- Bamboo (British band) – another duo with Carlisle
