= Henge Beat =

Studio album by Total Control
- Released: 7 August 2011
- Genre: Post-punk, new wave, indie rock, garage rock
- Length: 36:44
- Label: Iron Lung
- Producer: Mikey Young

Total Control chronology
Henge Beat (2011)	Typical System (2014)

Henge Beat is the debut full-length album by Australian post-punk band Total Control. Produced by band member Mikey Young, the album was released on 7 August 2011 by Iron Lung Records.

== Background ==
In a 2011 interview with The Quietus, Daniel Stewart explained that he had been reading Friedrich Nietzsche for his honours thesis at the time of the recording for Henge Beat. "I was like, 'I don't want this record to comes across as another contribution to the general theorem of, like, apocalyptic fantasies' and those kinds of things. Because I think that every generation likes to imagine that it's the last generation". Young added, "What I really wanted to say was that this is so narcissistic, this fantasy that we're the last people that are going to experience human thought or whatever. It's just a pattern of human culture that continually generates this terror that our death represents the death of everything. It's ridiculous."

== Critical reception ==
Professional ratings
Review scores
Source	Rating
Pitchfork	7.8/10
Popmatters	7/10 stars
Dusted	very favorable

Henge Beat received generally positive reviews from music critics. Pitchfork Media's Martin Douglas praised the album for not being "simply a 36-minute post-punk genre exercise" and the band for exploring "different realm of possibilities in every song, punctuating creeping lurches with ear-splitting explosions and delivering spacey instrumentals not incredibly far removed from elevator music right after." Similarly, Jedd Beaudoin of PopMatters complimented the various styles evident on the album, ranging from the "King Crimson-tinged 'Shame Thugs'" to the "Joy Division-inspired 'The Hammer'" to the "Sonic Youth-cum-Can-cum-Television romp 'Carpet Rash'" to the "sheer early '80s aggression" of lead single "One More Tonight". Doug Wallen of The Vine called the album "thin and metallic without being shiny or clean" and said it is "gripped by mood swings, though not to its detriment."

BrooklynVegan placed Henge Beat on its list of the 26 best albums of 2011, with writer Bill Pearis calling it "a real corker of a debut album." Rob Sheffield, writing for Rolling Stone, ranked it the 7th best album of the year, describing it as "[j]agged postpunk grooves by a bunch of Australian black-leather boys, not the kind of band you invite over for dinner."

== Track listing ==
All tracks are written by Total Control, except where noted.

No.	Title	Length
1.	"See More Glass"	4:10
2.	"Retiree"	1:59
3.	"One More Tonight"	3:53
4.	"The Hammer"	3:42
5.	"Stonehenge"	2:01
6.	"Carpet Rash"	6:57
7.	"Shame Thugs"	1:00
8.	"No Bibs"	1:35
9.	"Meds"	4:55
10.	"Sunday Baker"	1:54
11.	"Love Performance"	4:29
