= Nun (band) =

Australian band

- Origin: Melbourne, Victoria, Australia
- Years active: 2011–present
- Label: Aarght
- Members: Jenny Branagen, Steven Harris, Tom Hardisty, Hugh Young

Nun is a Melbourne-based synth punk band formed in 2011. They have released two albums.

== History ==
Nun started as a recording project as part of Tom Hardisty's studies at RMIT in 2011, with Steven Harris, Hugh Young, and Jenny Branagan joining as the project grew.

=== Solvents / Nun ===
The band released their first single Solvents on Nihilistic Orbs in 2012, which was followed by their debut self-titled album Nun in 2014, released by Aarght Records in Australia, Avant! in Italy, and HoZac Records in America. While recording their album the band where highlighted in Jimi Kritzler's book Noise in My Head: Voices from the Ugly Australian Underground. The book features interviews with several independent and underground bands, and was celebrated for its focus on notable Australian musicians who may not have received enough mainstream press.

Nun's debut album was reviewed around the world, with praise in Australia from national newspaper the Herald Sun and popular music website Mess+Noise. Outside of Australia, the album was reviewed by several music blogs in Italy, Poland, and Finland, while in the USA, Nun received nods from CMJ, Pitchfork, Tiny Mix Tapes, and Live Eye TV.

=== Immersion / The Dome ===
Following their debut, Nun recorded a second album in 2016, and at the beginning of 2017 performed the new song Can't Chain live on Melbourne radio station 3RRR. At the time they announced their new album The Dome would be out that year, but it remained unreleased until 2018. Instead the band released Immersion (With Enderie), a cassette tape / digital release featuring remixes of Immersion, a song from their debut album.

When The Dome was released in 2018, it came out on Aarght Records and HoZac Records with the delay attributed to each of the band members taking time to listen over the recordings while juggling their other bands and work commitments.

The album was well received across Australia, with praise from local radio stations 4ZZZ and 3RRR, and in street press like Forte and Beat. Outside of Australia, Maximumrocknroll likened Nun to Siouxsie Sioux and Men's Recovery Project, and noted Nun predated "the current trend" of "darkwave synth punk records...by more than a few years".

=== Post-The Dome ===
Following the release and tour of The Dome, Nun have been inactive, but its members have continued to make synth heavy music elsewhere. Since 2013, Jenny Branagan has collaborated with Andrea Blake as VACUUM, and they released their debut album in 2022. Steven Harris has released two solo album as Pyrrhic. Tom Hardisty has released his own solo albums, and has continued to play with Constant Mongrel which also features Hugh Young.

== Members ==
- Jenny Branagan (Vocals and synthesiser)
- Steven Harris (Drum machines and synthesiser)
- Hugh Young (Synthesiser)
- Tom Hardisty (Bass synthesiser).

== Discography ==
=== Singles ===
Solvents, 2012

Immersion (With Enderie), 2017

=== Albums ===
Nun, 2014

The Dome, 2018
