= Typical System =

Studio album by Total Control
- Released: 24 June 2014
- Genres: Post-punk, new wave, indie rock, garage rock
- Length: 40:28
- Label: Iron Lung
- Producer: Mikey Young

Total Control chronology
Henge Beat (2011)	Typical System (2014)

Typical System is the second full-length album by Australian post-punk band Total Control. Produced by band member Mikey Young, the album was released on 24 June 2014 by Iron Lung Records. It peaked at No. 5 on the ARIA Hitseekers Albums chart.

At the Music Victoria Awards of 2014, the album was nominated for Best Album.

== Reception ==
Professional ratings
Aggregate scores
Source	Rating
Metacritic	83/100
Review scores
Source	Rating
Alternative Press	4/5 stars
Consequence of Sound	B−
Exclaim!	9/10
The Guardian	5/5 stars
The Line of Best Fit	8.5/10
The Music	4.5/5 stars
NME	8/10
Pitchfork	8.0/10
PopMatters	7/10
Under the Radar	8/10

Typical System received generally positive reviews from music critics. At Metacritic, which assigns a normalised rating out of 100 to reviews from mainstream critics, the album received an average score of 83, which indicates "universal acclaim", based on 11 reviews.

== Accolades ==
Publication	Country	Accolade	Rank
Noisey	US	Noisey's Top 25 Albums of 2014	11
Rough Trade	UK	Rough Trade's Top 100 Albums of The 2014	11
Flavorwire	US	Flavorwire's 30 Best Albums of 2014	19
Paste	US	Paste's 50 Best Albums of 2014	43
Under the Radar	US	Under the Radar's Top 100 Albums of 2014	58

== Track listing ==
CD (TCON102), vinyl (LUNGS053)

All tracks are written by Michael Young, James Vinciguerra, Daniel Stewart, Zephyr Pavey, Al Montfort, except where noted

No.	Title	Length
1.	"Glass" (Young, Vinciguerra, Stewart)	6:07
2.	"Expensive Dog"	3:52
3.	"Flesh War"	4:40
4.	"Systematic Fuck"	2:11
5.	"Liberal Party" (Young, Vinciguerra, Stewart, Pavey)	3:35
6.	"2 Less Jacks"	2:44
7.	"Black Springs"	7:24
8.	"The Ferryman" (Young, Vinciguerra)	2:45
9.	"Hunter" (Young, Stewart, Pavey, David West)	3:37
10.	"Safety Net" (Young, Vinciguerra, Stewart, West, Pavey)	3:35
