= Super Wild Horses =

Australian musical group

- Origin: Melbourne
- Genres: No-fi/Garage/Post punk/Pop
- Years active: 2008–present
- Labels: Aarght! Records (AUS) and Hozac Records (US)
- Members: Amy Franz (guitar, keyboards, drums, vocals); Hayley McKee (guitar, keyboards, drums, vocals)
- Website: MySpace site

Super Wild Horses are a Melbourne-based Australian musical duo formed in 2008.

== Biography ==
Amy Franz and Hayley McKee, schoolfriends from Perth, moved to Melbourne to form no-fi band Super Wild Horses following a bratty shouting match in a car. Although initially 'barely being able to play their instruments', 'fashionably of the moment' success was achieved with the aid of Mikey Young of Aarght Records and Eddy Current Suppression Ring recording the debut EP. They became known for loud, raw performances, and their versatility in swapping instruments on stage. Their first album, Fifteen, was released in 2010 as a co release with US record label Hozac HoZac Records and Australia's Aarght Records. It featured in college charts and received good reviews including a favourable Pitchfork mention. They embarked on their first tour of America in September 2010, playing in New York, Philadelphia, Chicago, Austin, San Francisco, New Orleans and at the garage, Lo-fi music festival Goner Fest run by Goner Records.

2013 is slated for a second full-length album release.

== Discography ==
=== Cassette ===
- "Run With" - Sixteen Tambourines (2012)

=== 7" EP ===
- "Super Wild Horses / Boomgates" split 7-inch release - self released (2011)

=== Albums ===
- "Fifteen" - Aarght! Records, Hozac Records (2010)
- "Crosswords" - Dot Dash (2013)

=== Compilations ===
- "World's Gone Bad Vol. 7-inch - Almost Ready Records (2009)
- "Super Wild Horses" 6 song EP - Aarght Records (2008)
