= Parsnip (band) =

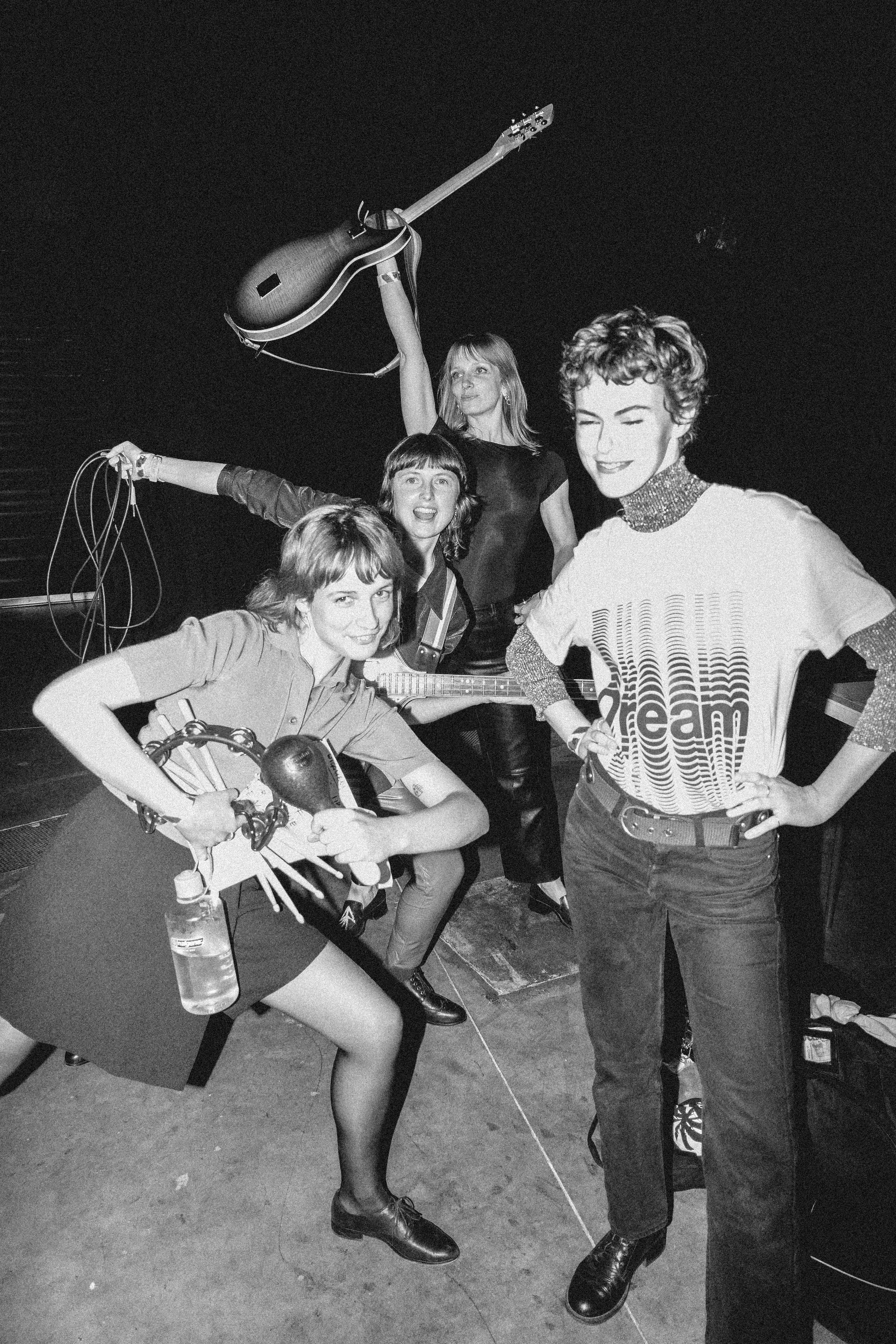

Background information
- Origin: Melbourne, Victoria, Australia
- Years active: 2016-present
- Labels: Anti Fade; Trouble in Mind; Upset the Rhythm

Parsnip is an Australian rock band. They released their debut album, When the Tree Bears Fruit in 2019 with the line-up of Carolyn Hawkins on drums, Stella Rennex on guitar and vocals, Paris Richenson bass guitar and vocals and Rebecca Liston on keyboards.

== History ==
Parsnip formed in early 2016 in Melbourne after meeting at Geelong's Jerkfest. Initial line-up was Sequoia Harris (of the Clits) on organ, Carolyn Hawkins on drums (from Melbourne), Paris Richens on bass guitar and vocals (from Geelong), and Stella Rennex on guitar and vocals (from Sydney). Harris of The Clits was replaced by Rebecca Liston on keyboards.

They were all friends prior to forming Parsnip, and spent their first year together playing almost every week before recording their debut self-titled EP. Before joining the band, Rennex had played saxophone since she was eight and later studied music in high school. Liston and Hawkins also studied music, while Richens was the only member without any formal musical training.

After their debut album, When the Tree Bears Fruit was released on Anti Fade Records in 2019. Parsnip toured the United States, where the album was released by Trouble in Mind. In 2022 the band played as part of Homecoming, a tour that returns musicians to perform in their hometowns after the lockdowns of the COVID-19 pandemic.

In 2024 they released second album Behold, on Anti-Fade in Australia and Upset the Rhythm in the UK.

== Members ==
- Sequoia Harris – organ (2016)
- Carolyn Hawkins – drums (2016–present)
- Stella Rennex – guitar, vocals (2016–present)
- Paris Richens – bass guitar, vocals (2016–present)
- Rebecca Liston – keyboards (2016–present)

== Discography ==
=== Extended plays ===
- Parsnip, late 2017
- Feeling Small, 2018
- Adding Up, 2020

=== Albums ===
- When the Tree Bears Fruit, 2019
- Behold, 2024
