= Aarght Records =

Australian record label

- Founded: 2007
- Founder: Richard Stanley
- Genre: rock
- Country of origin: Australia
- Location: Melbourne
- Official website: aarghtrecords.bandcamp.com

Aarght Records (sometimes stylised AARGHT! Records) was a record label run by Richard Stanley based in Melbourne, Victoria, Australia.

The label was started in 2007 by Richard with Mikey Young, Per Bystrom and Jonathan Wilmott, who played together in the band Ooga Boogas. By 2016, Richard ran the label with Jake Robertson, who was part of several Melbourne bands that released music on Aarght, such as Ausmuteants, Hierophants, Leather Towel and Alien Nosejob.

Since its founding, Aarght has released records by Total Control, Super Wild Horses, Eddy Current Suppression Ring, Ubik, and Nun. In 2009 Maximum Rocknroll called them "one of the finest modern purveyors of punk musics", while Vice wrote that Aarght Records was "one of the most important independent record labels in Australia". The label released 48 releases on vinyl, cassette, and CD up until 2019.

The label's final release was 'Check The Odds', an extended play 7" by Ill Globo which came out August 16, 2019. Since then many of Aarght Records' bands have released music on Anti Fade Records. In 2019 the two labels joined for a gig at Melbourne Music Week featuring their bands.

The label is noted for releases associated with Melbourne's punk and garage scene.
