= Primo! =

Australian musical group

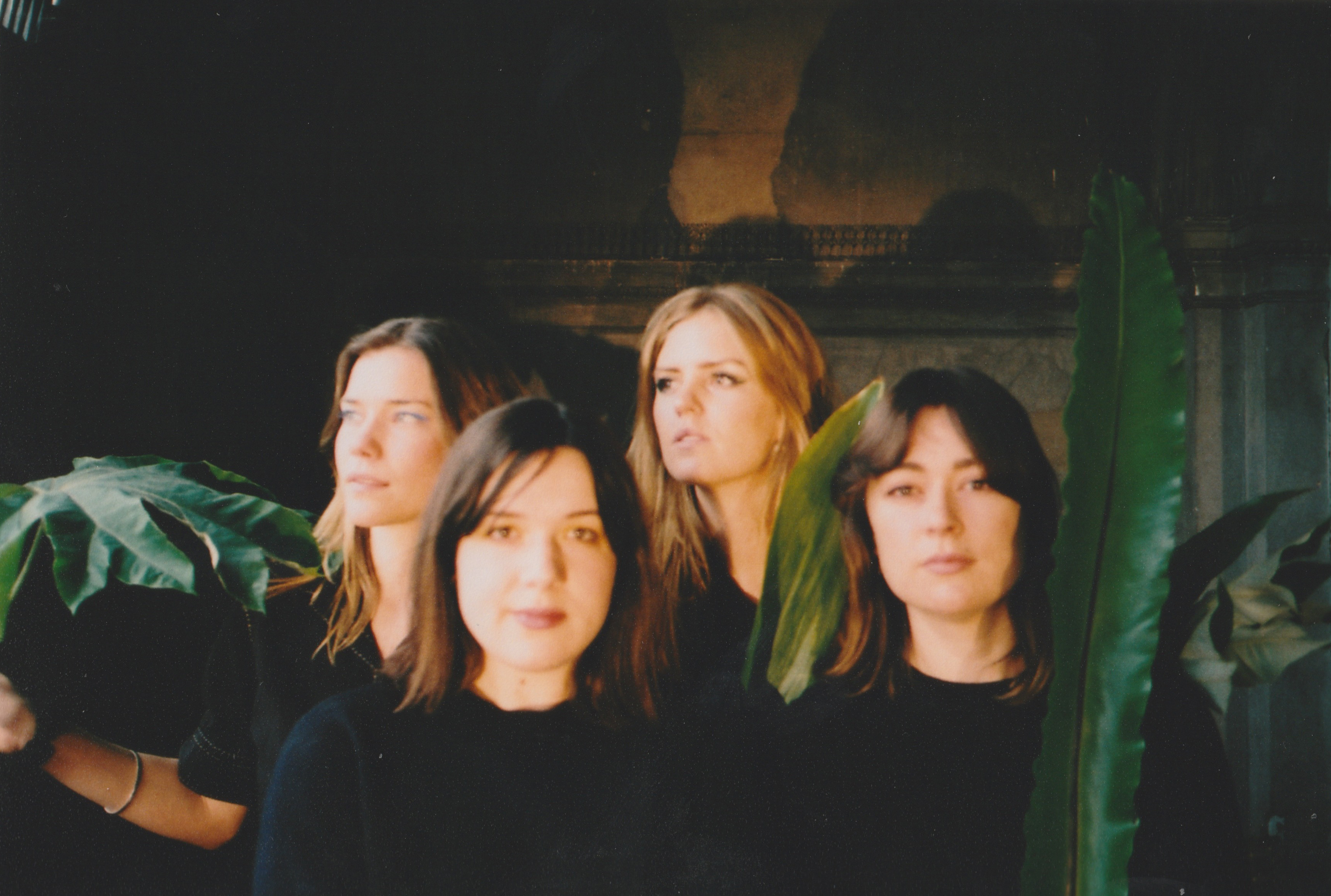
- Primo! in 2020

Background information
- Origin: Melbourne, Victoria, Australia
- Genre: Indie rock
- Years active: 2016–present
- Labels: Anti Fade; Upset the Rhythm
- Members: Violetta DelConte Race; Xanthe Waite; Suzanne Walker; Amy Hill
- Website: primocassetto.bandcamp.com

Primo! are an Australian indie rock band from Melbourne, which formed in the early 2010s. By 2018 the line-up was Violetta DelConte Race, Xanthe Waite, Suzanne Walker and Amy Hill.

== History ==
The band was formed by Violetta DelConte Race (of The Shifters) and Xanthe Waite (of Terry) as a two-piece in the early 2010s. Delconte Race, on lead guitar and vocals is from Melbourne's eastern suburbs. Waite, on bass guitar and vocals, relocated from Sydney and the pair started jamming in 2010. They were joined in Primo!, on drums and vocals, by Suzanne Walker.

Following a cassette only extended play, Primo Cassetto in April 2016, and a split single with LA Mood in 2017, the band's debut album Amici was released by English record label Upset the Rhythm in 2018. It was awarded 7.5/10 by Pitchfork, and 4.5/5 by All Music, while Vice listed it as one of 2018's essential album releases. Australian community radio station 4ZZZ praised the album's "sonic variance" and called it a "suprisingly [sic] unique record".

For their next album Sogni, bassist Amy Hill joined the trio, having previously played with Waite in the rock band, Terry. The four-piece provided vocals, guitars, drums and sound effects for Mick Harvey's Nocturnal April in 2019 at Melbourne Museum.

Sogni was released on 17 April 2020 by Upset the Rhythm in the UK and Anti Fade Records in Australia, and was preceded by the digital singles Best and Fairest, Perfect Paper, and Machine.

The album was awarded 7.5/10 by Pitchfork, and 4.5/5 by All Music, whileThe Music awarded it Album of the Week upon release and later listed it as one of their Top 30 Albums of 2020 so far. Bandcamp listed the album among "The Best Punk on Bandcamp" in May 2020, and it received further praise from Maximum Rocknroll and The Quietus, who wrote the album showed how Primo's contribution to rock music was essential.

== Discography ==
Albums

- Amici (2018) - Upset the Rhythm
- Sogni (2020) - Upset the Rhythm / Anti Fade Records

Singles

- Daphne (2017) - Split with LA Mood - Milk! Records / Bedroom Suck Records
- Best and Fairest (2020)
- Perfect Paper (2020)
- Machine (2020)

Other

- Primo Cassetto (2016) - Hidiotic
