= Playing Favorites (Sheer Mag album) =

Studio album by Sheer Mag
- Released: March 1, 2024
- Genre: Hard rock • glam rock • garage punk • power pop
- Length: 37:45
- Label: Third Man

Sheer Mag chronology
A Distant Call (2019)	Playing Favorites (2024)

Singles from Playing Favorites
- 1. "All Lined Up" Released: August 3, 2023; 2. "Playing Favorites" Released: November 9, 2023; 3. "Moonstruck" Released: January 9, 2024; 4. "Eat It and Beat It" Released: February 15, 2024

Playing Favorites is the third studio album by American band Sheer Mag. It was released on March 1, 2024, through Third Man Records. It marks their first studio release in five years, following A Distant Call (2019).

== Background and singles ==
Singer Tina Halladay felt like their first few efforts were a "personal coming out party", while this new record signifies a point where they moved "past that", in that she could not imagine having created these songs years prior. She further opined that artists do not seem "to write straight up rock bangers anymore" and declared their goal to have an album that puts "huge, catchy songwriting front and centre".

On August 3, 2023, the band announced that they had signed with Third Man Records and released the lead single "All Lined Up". The album was announced on November 9, 2023, alongside the release of its eponymous second single, a song that spins "a tale of life on the road" with a sense of "self-assured swagger". In January and February 2024, Sheer Mag released two more singles: "Moonstruck" and "Eat It and Beat It". Following the release of the album, the band is set to embark on a headlining North American tour in spring 2024.

== Critical reception ==
Linnie Greene of Spin awarded the album a B+ grade and wrote, "These songs are atmospheric the way Thin Lizzy on the jukebox electrifies a room, closer to bodily possession than mere catchiness. Tina Halladay's growl entwines with Kyle Seely's razor-sharp riffs, and the result is alchemical: melodies that burrow deep alongside radio classics like Rick Springfield's "Jesse's Girl" or Tom Petty and the Heartbreakers' "Don't Do Me Like That." Where 2019's A Distant Call leaned closer to ferocious AC/DC licks and scathing indictments, Playing Favorites trades menace for wonderment."

== Track listing ==
All tracks are written by Christina Halladay, Matthew Palmer, Hart Seely, and Kyle Seely.

Playing Favorites track listing
No.	Title	Length
1.	"Playing Favorites"	3:01
2.	"Eat It and Beat It"	4:08
3.	"All Lined Up"	3:40
4.	"Don't Come Lookin'"	3:00
5.	"I Gotta Go"	3:46
6.	"Moonstruck"	3:05
7.	"Mechanical Garden"	5:54
8.	"Golden Hour"	3:19
9.	"Tea on the Kettle"	2:36
10.	"Paper Time"	2:49
11.	"When You Get Back"	2:27
Total length:		37:45

== Personnel ==
Sheer Mag

- Tina Halladay
- Matt Palmer – production
- Kyle Seely – production, engineering, concept
- Hart Seely – production, engineering

Additional contributors

- Hunter Davidsohn – production, mixing, engineering
- D. James Goodwin – mastering
- Jordan Williams – design
- Emily Moses – cover photo
- Christopher Postlewaite – band photo
- Abby Johnson – back cover photo
- Sarah Goldstein – layout
- Gigi Hull – stylist
