= Total Control (band) =

Australian post-punk band

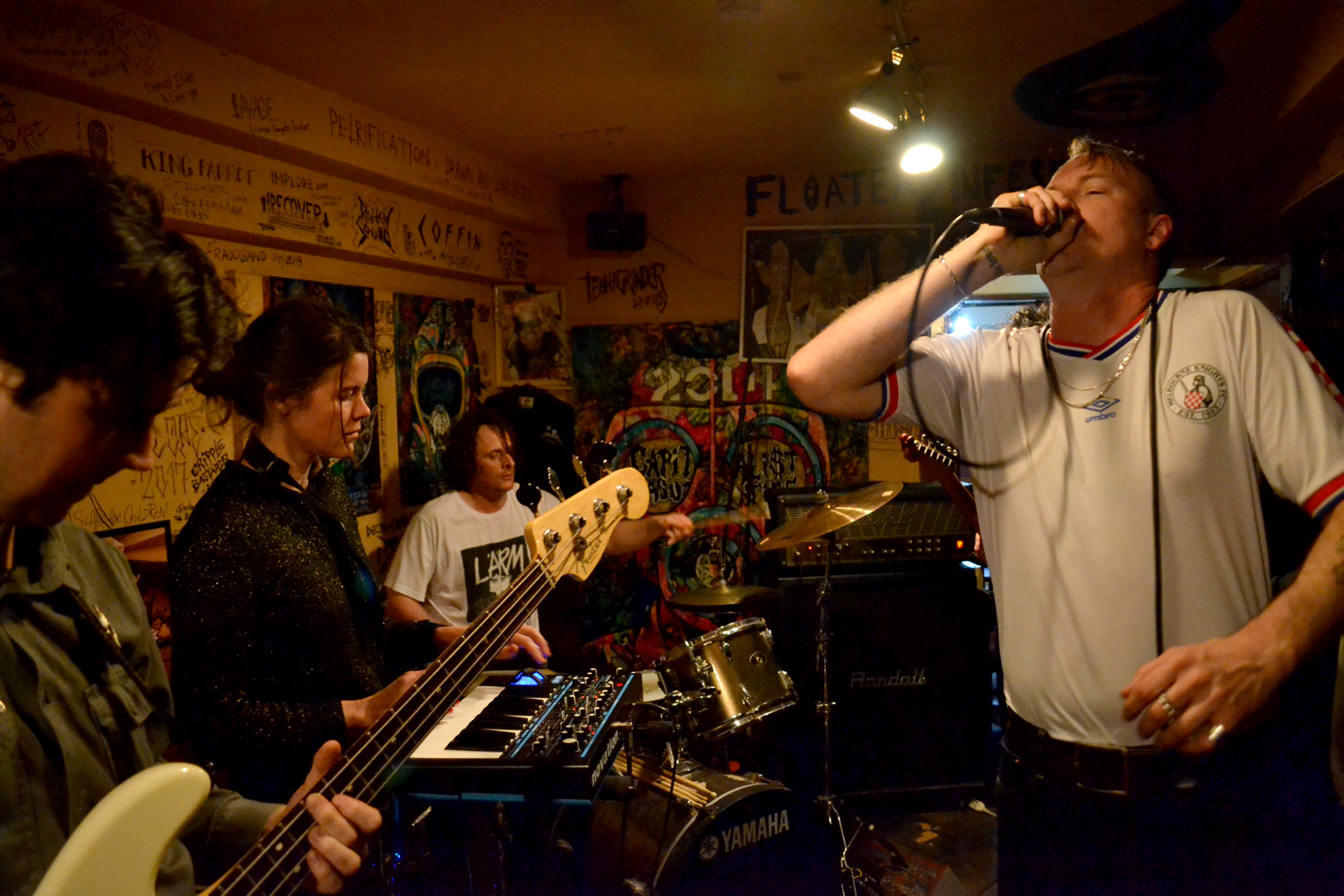
- Total Control in 2019.

Background information
- Origin: Melbourne, Victoria, Australia
- Genres: Post-punk, garage rock, garage punk, indie rock, alternative rock, new wave, electronic
- Years active: 2008–present
- Labels: Iron Lung, Inertia, Fuse, Sub Pop
- Members: Daniel Stewart; Mikey Young; Al Montfort; Zephyr Pavey; James Vinciguerra

Total Control is an Australian post-punk band that formed in Melbourne, Australia in 2008. The band's line-up includes Mikey Young (guitar, keyboards), Dan Stewart (vocals), Al Montfort (guitar), Zephyr Pavey (bass), and James Vinciguerra (drums). After a series of singles, the band's debut album, Henge Beat, was released in August 2011. Their second album, Typical System, was released in June 2014.

== History ==
Total Control was formed in 2008 by Eddy Current Suppression Ring band member Mikey Young and UV Race's Dan Stewart. The pair, who came together over a shared interest in early 1980s acts such as Devo, Gary Numan, the Screamers, the Adolescents and Orchestral Manoeuvres in the Dark, recorded some songs using a sampler and synthesizers at Young's home studio. They gained a following over the next few years after releasing a series of 7-inch singles and playing only a handful of live shows. Total Control became a quintet with the additions of guitarist Al Montfort, bassist Zephyr Pavey, and drummer James Vinciguerra. Young explained the reason for the expansion to The Washington Post: "Bands with drum machines and three synths are just not as much fun to watch as bands with drummers and guitars," he said. "We realized it couldn't be good live, so we tried to adapt the songs to work in a rock-and-roll band."

The band released their debut full-length album, Henge Beat, in August 2011 on Seattle's Iron Lung Records. They went on a US tour with San Francisco-based band Thee Oh Sees, with whom they also released a split EP, and performed at the All Tomorrow's Parties music festival in Minehead, Somerset in December 2011. The single "Scene From a Marriage" was released by Sub Pop in October 2012. The group released their second album, Typical System, in June 2014.

== Discography ==
=== Studio albums ===
| Title | Album details |
|---|---|
| Henge Beat | Released: 7 August 2011; Label: Iron Lung Records; Format: LP, CD, digital download |
| Typical System | Released: 24 June 2014; Label: Iron Lung Records; Format: LP, CD, digital download |
| Laughing At The System | Released: 8 December 2017; Label: Alter Records; Format: LP, digital download |

=== 7" singles ===
- "Stare Way"/"Meds"/"Total Control"/"Full Moon" - Aarght! Records (2008)
- "Retiree"/"Meds II" - Iron Lung Records (2009)
- "Paranoid Video"/"Real Estate" - Smartguy Records (2010)
- "Pyre Island"/"Mineshaft" - Hustle Muscle (2011)
- "Scene From A Marriage"/"Contract" - Sub Pop (2012)

=== Compilations ===
- 7"s (collects tracks from first four 7"s) - Blinded Records (2013)

=== EPs ===
- Thee Oh Sees/Total Control [split EP] - Castle Face (2011)
- Carpet Rash - Home Loan Records (2012)

== Awards and nominations ==
=== AIR Awards ===
The Australian Independent Record Awards (commonly known informally as AIR Awards) is an annual awards night to recognise, promote and celebrate the success of Australia's Independent Music sector.

| Year | Nominee / work | Award | Result |
|---|---|---|---|
| 2014 | Typical System | Best Independent Album | Nominated |

=== Australian Music Prize ===
The Australian Music Prize (the AMP) is an annual award of $30,000 given to an Australian band or solo artist in recognition of the merit of an album released during the year of award. The commenced in 2005.

| Year | Nominee / work | Award | Result |
|---|---|---|---|
| 2014 | Typical System | Australian Music Prize | Nominated |

=== J Award ===
The J Awards are an annual series of Australian music awards that were established by the Australian Broadcasting Corporation's youth-focused radio station Triple J. They commenced in 2005.

| Year | Nominee / work | Award | Result |
|---|---|---|---|
| 2014 | Typical System | Australian Album of the Year | Nominated |

=== Music Victoria Awards ===
The Music Victoria Awards, are an annual awards night celebrating Victorian music. They commenced in 2005.

| Year | Nominee / work | Award | Result |
|---|---|---|---|
| 2014 | Typical System | Best Album | Nominated |
| 2014 | themselves | Best Band | Nominated |
| 2014 | "Flesh War" | Best Song | Nominated |
| 2016 | Al Montfort | Best Male Artist | Nominated |
