= Sauna Youth =

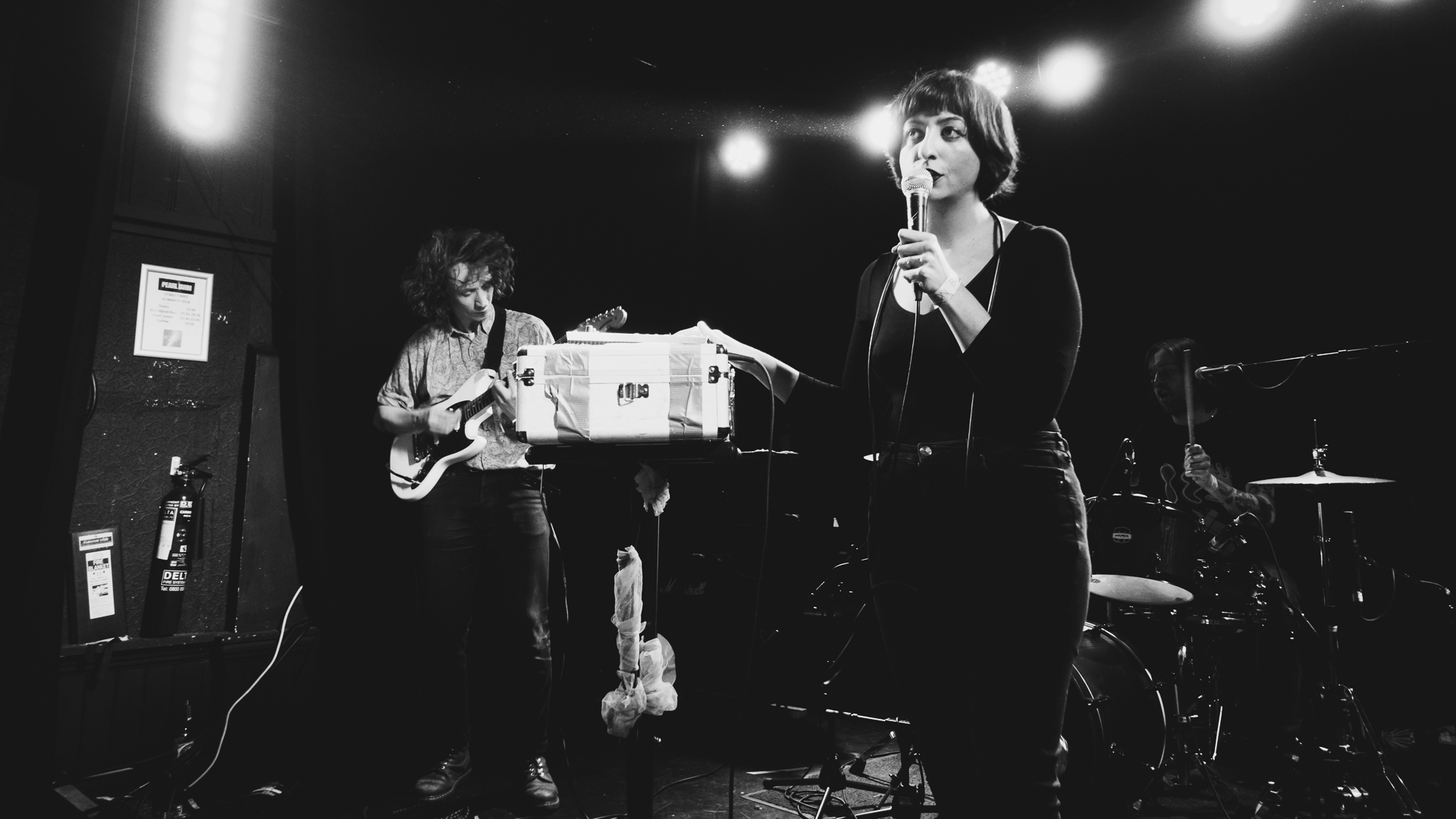
- Sauna Youth at Boston Music Room in 2018

Background information
- Origin: London, England
- Genres: Post-punk, punk rock
- Years active: 2009–2019
- Labels: Faux Discx, Gringo Records, Upset the Rhythm
- Past members: Rich Phoenix; Lindsay Corstorphine; Christopher Murphy; Jen Calleja; Reza Mirehsan

Sauna Youth were a London-based post-punk band formed by ex-members of punk rock bands The Steal and Captain Everything! in 2009. They released three albums, Dreamlands (2012), Distractions (2015), and Deaths (2018), plus various singles.

Members of Sauna Youth also played in the group Monotony, an alter ego of sorts where they all switch instruments. The two bands released a split single on Upset the Rhythm in 2015.

== History ==
Sauna Youth formed in 2009 with members living between Brighton and London. The original lineup of vocalist Rich Phoenix (previously of Captain Everything! and The Steal), guitarist Lindsay Corstorphine (previously of The Steal), bassist Christopher Murphy, and drummer Reza Mirehsan, made a demo tape titled Planet Sounds, then followed it up with their first single, the self-released "Youth" in 2010. The "Mad Mind" cassette came out that same year, with their second single "Lists" and a split with Ale Mania in 2011.

That year Mirehsan left, Phoenix moved over to drums, and Jen Calleja joined on vocals and sampler. Their first full-length album was co-released by Faux Discx and Gringo Records in 2012. After a single in 2013, "False Jesii Pt. 2," the band began work on their second album. During the sessions they decided to switch instruments and form a second band, Monotony. Before the album's release in June 2015, their new label Upset the Rhythm put out a split Sauna Youth/Monotony single that May.

Sauna Youth have recorded several sessions for Marc Riley on his BBC 6 Music radio show from 2014 to 2016 (as well as one as Monotony). They also appeared as both incarnations on the made for iPlayer live music show he presented in 2015.

In July 2018, the band announced their new album, Deaths, with first single "Percentages". It was released on 7 September that year, again via Upset The Rhythm. In advance of the album’s release they toured the UK with Protomartyr in August, before which they also played the Visions Festival 2018 pre-party with Fucked Up in London. The following year they headlined a tour honoring the fifteenth anniversary of their label, Upset The Rhythm.

Jen Calleja was one of several guest vocalists to contribute to Raise Your Voice Joyce: Contemporary Shouts From Contemporary Voices, a compilation of music covertly recorded by the Canadian band Fucked Up in 2018.

== Discography ==
=== Albums ===
- Dreamlands - Faux Discx/Gringo Records, 12" LP, MP3 (2012)
- Distractions - Upset the Rhythm, 12" LP, MP3 (2015)
- Deaths - Upset the Rhythm, 12" LP, MP3 (2018)

=== Compilations ===
- In Flux - Self released, MP3 (2020)
- The Void - Self released, MP3 (2020)

=== Singles and EPs ===
- "Youth" - Self released, 7", MP3 (2010)
- "Mad Mind" - Suplex cassettes, Cassette, MP3 (2010)
- "Lists" - Self released, 7", MP3 (2011)
- "False Jesii Pt. II" - Static Shock Records, 7", MP3 (2013)
- "The Bridge" - Upset the Rhythm, 7", MP3 (2015)

=== Split releases ===
- Split with Ale Mania - Faux Discx, 7", MP3 (2011)
- Split with Full Ugly, Omi Palone, The Stevens - Paradise Vendors Inc, 7", MP3 (2012)
- Split with Monotony - Upset the Rhythm, 7", MP3, (2015)
