= R.I.P Society Records =

Australian record label

R.I.P. Society Records
- Founded: 2008
- Founder: Nic Warnock
- Genre: Rock
- Country of origin: Australia
- Location: Sydney
- Official website: ripsociety.bandcamp.com

R.I.P Society is a label founded in 2008 by Sydney based musician Nic Warnock, who also designed their logo. It is strongly associated with Repressed Records, a record label Warnock works for.

The label's debut release was a 7" single by Circle Pit, released in 2009. Warnock, who was a member of Circle Pit, decided to start R.I.P. Society Records after a deal to release the 7" on another label didn't eventuate. The release was mostly ignored in Australia, but received positive reviews overseas, such as in The Wire.

In 2011 the label won Mess + Noise's Best Independent Record Label and then had their first hit in 2012 with Royal Headache's debut self-titled album. It won Best Independent Album at the AIR Awards of 2012, with the band nominated for two more awards also.

Their first release from a band not based in Sydney was Brisbane-based band Kitchen's Floor in 2009, followed by the first Melbourne-based band Zond in 2010, and the label developed a strong reputation along Australia's East Coast, with particular support from Melbourne record store Missing Link.

In Jimi Kritzler's 2014 study of Australian underground music, Noise in my head: voices from the ugly Australian underground, he wrote the importance of R.I.P. Society Records was that it showed Sydney was just as able as Melbourne in its ability to release good independent Australian music.

In 2014 the label celebrated its fifth birthday with an eight-hour concert at the Sydney Opera House as part of Vivid Live. They were invited back in 2017 for another concert celebrating the label's 15th anniversary.
