= Upset the Rhythm =

Upset The Rhythm
- Founded: 2003 (promoter); 2005 (record label)
- Genre: Punk rock; post-punk; indie rock
- Country of origin: United Kingdom
- Location: London
- Official website: http://www.upsettherhythm.co.uk/

Upset The Rhythm is an independent record label based in London with a varied roster of leftfield artists and bands; they also operate as a diverse DIY live music promoter. Huw Stephens featured Upset The Rhythm as "purveyors of interesting indie" on his BBC Radio 1 show (24 November 2011) as part of his ongoing 'Label Of Love' feature. As of 2015, Upset The Rhythm had 85 releases.

== History ==
Upset The Rhythm initially formed in 2003 while its members were organising a concert for Deerhoof. By 2015, Upset The Rhythm had organised about 700 shows.

Upset The Rhythm shows occur each week in venues across London from smaller DIY hubs like Power Lunches to more established venues like The Roundhouse. The record label began in the Summer of 2005, funded by a gift of profits from a The Evens show by Ian MacKaye. The label's first release was a mini-album by Death Sentence: Panda!, followed by debut releases by John Maus, No Age and Future Islands. The company works with unusual and upcoming American acts, and also promotes the UK's DIY music scene, releasing records by Trash Kit, Cold Pumas, The Pheromoans, Pega Monstro Silver Fox, The World and Terry.

By December 2013, Upset the Rhythm's live music promotions included working with Tate Britain and Frieze magazine on their music programming, organising an all day charity concert with artist David Shrigley for Amnesty International and co-founding the art/music festival Yes Way with London gallery Auto Italia South East.

== Artists on Upset The Rhythm ==
- Bamboo
- Deerhoof
- Dog Chocolate
- Ed Schrader’s Music Beat
- Feature
- Future Islands
- gay against you
- The Green Child
- Guttersnipe
- Lucky Dragons
- John Maus
- Naked Roommate
- No Age
- No Babies
- Normil Hawaiians
- Peepholes
- Pega Monstro
- The Pheromoans
- Primo!
- Rattle
- Sauna Youth
- Terry
- Trash Kit
- Vexx
- Wetdog
- Xiu Xiu
