= Anti Fade Records =

Australian record label

ANTI FADE records
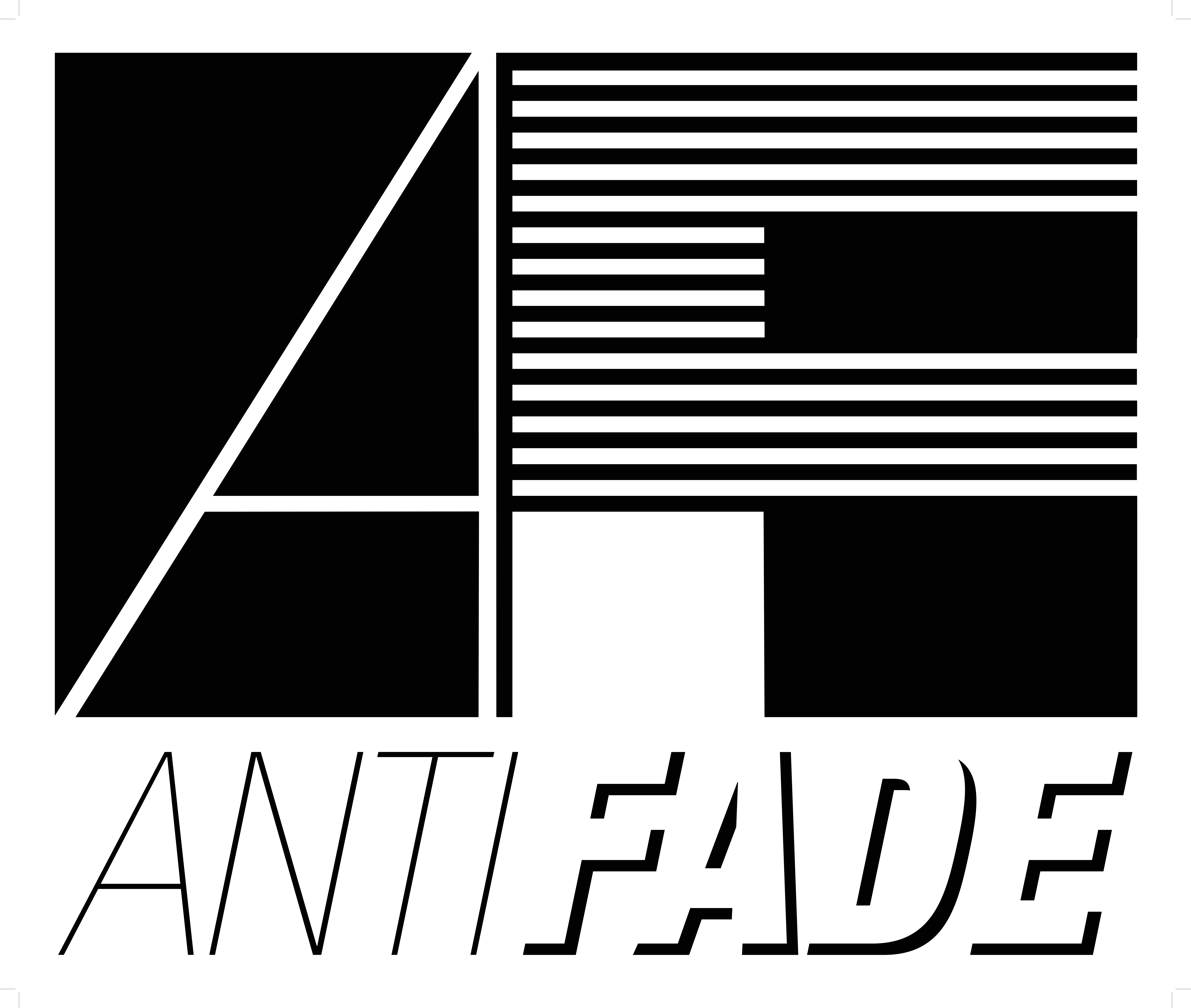
- Founded: 2011
- Founder: Billy Gardner
- Genre: rock
- Country of origin: Australia
- Location: Melbourne
- Official website: antifaderecords.bandcamp.com

Anti Fade Records is a record label run by Billy Gardner based in Geelong, Victoria, Australia.

The first release for the record label was a limited edition C30 cassette by The Bonniwells titled "Sunny Brick" in 2011, and they have since put out over 80 releases, with Henry Rollins said to be a fan. Gardner told Beat Magazine that the impetus for creating the label was to release a compilation album he was curating called New Centre of the Universe Vol. 1. The album was released in 2012 and featured tracks by Dick Diver, King Gizzard & the Lizard Wizard, The Murlocs, Hierophants, UV Race, and The Frowning Clouds.

Since its incarnation Anti Fade has released records by Parsnip, Primo!, Alien Nosejob, Ausmeutants, Bananagun, R.M.F.C., Vintage Crop, and Civic, which has led to the label gaining a strong local popularity, with Geelong's Forte called them "one of Australia’s best-loved independent labels...[and] Australia’s best export for garage, punk, shoegaze and psych".

The label also hosts their annual Jerk Fest, held at the Barwon Club Hotel in Geelong since 2015, and has curated events for Melbourne Music Week.

In 2020 the label expanded into coloured vinyl releases for the first time, which were eagerly bought up by fans. The following year Anti Fade's headquarters – Billy Gardner's home – was damaged in a fire. A fundraiser T-shirt was released, and the label continued to put out new releases, although Gardner noted that the ongoing COVID-19 pandemic in Victoria meant 2021 could see fewer releases from Anti Fade, with bands unable to play together or record.
