= Women in punk rock =

Women's music history

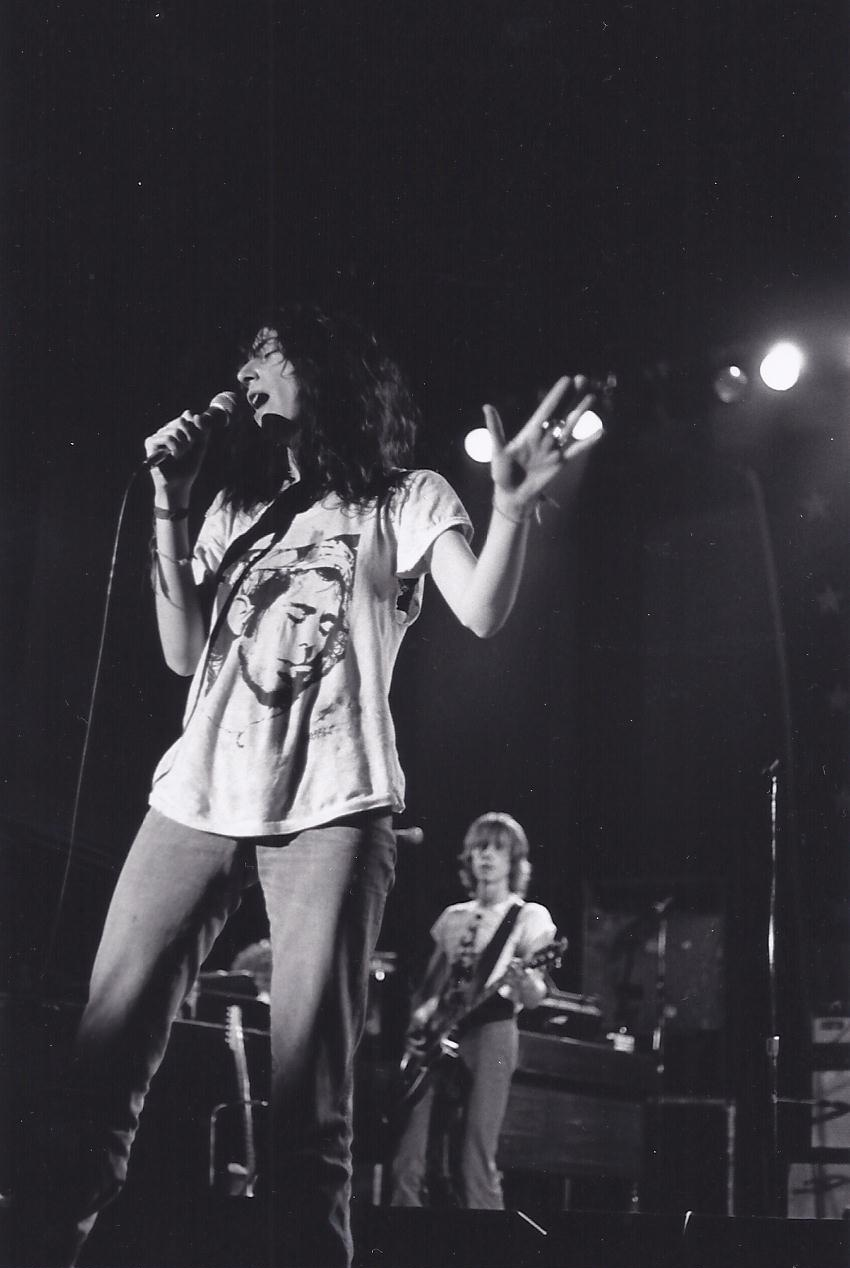
Patti Smith, 1978

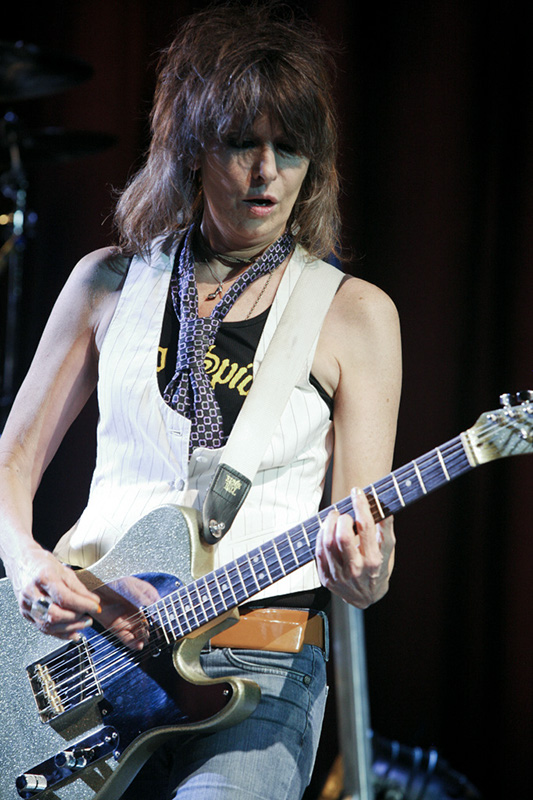
Chrissie Hynde, 2013

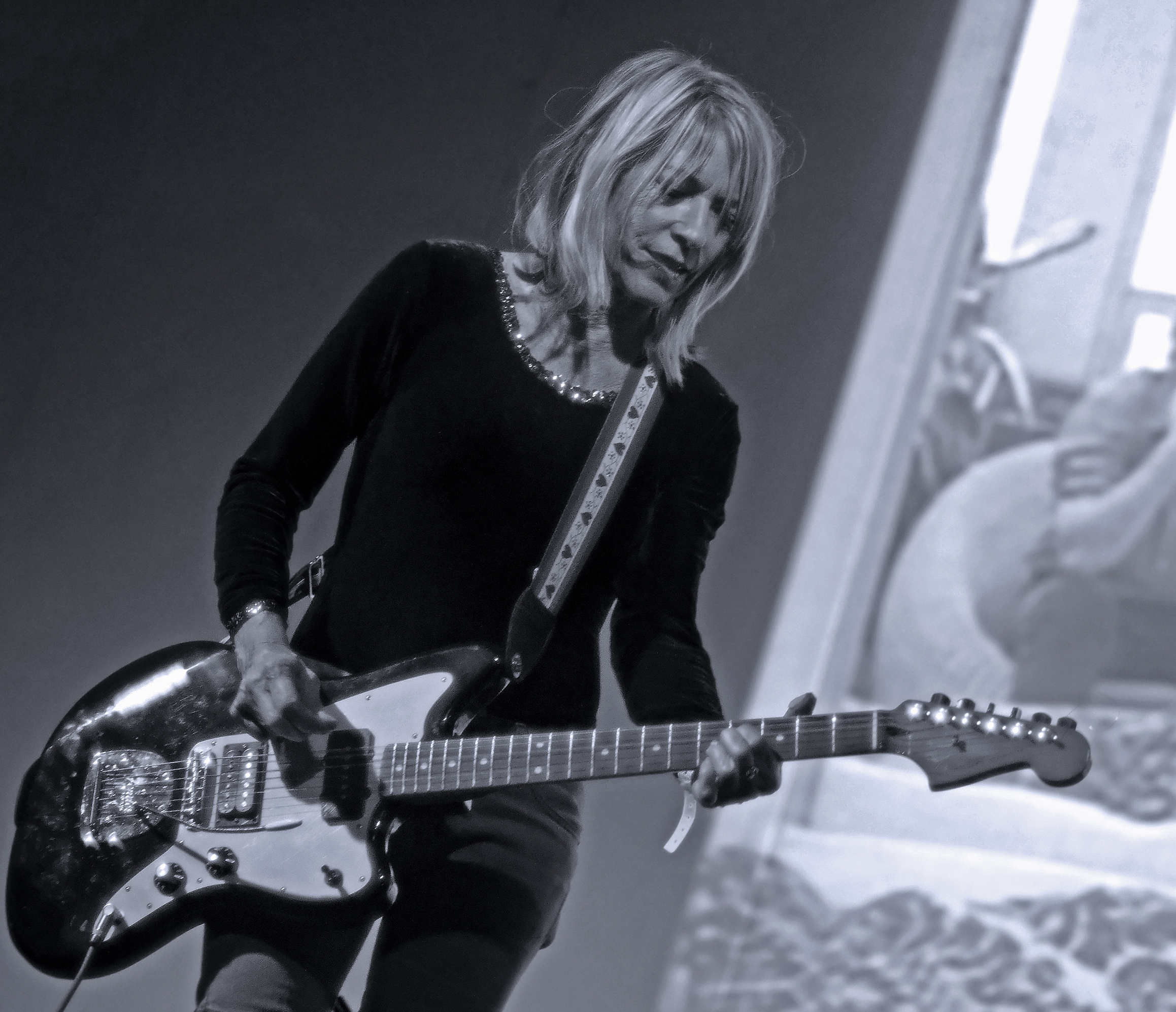
Kim Gordon in 2012

Women have made significant contributions to punk rock music and its subculture since its inception in the 1970s. In contrast to the rock music and heavy metal scenes of the 1970s, which were dominated by men, the anarchic, counter-cultural mindset of the punk scene in mid-and-late 1970s encouraged women to participate. This participation played a role in the historical development of punk music, especially in the US and UK at that time, and continues to influence and enable future generations. Women have participated in the punk scene as lead singers, instrumentalists, as all-female bands, zine contributors and fashion designers.

Rock historian Helen Reddington wrote that the popular image of young punk women musicians as focused on the fashion aspects of the scene (fishnet stockings, spiky hair, etc.) was stereotypical. She states that many, if not all women punks were more interested in the ideology and socio-political implications, rather than the fashion. Music historian Caroline Coon contends that before punk, women in rock music were virtually invisible; in contrast, in punk, she argues, "It would be possible to write the whole history of punk music without mentioning any male bands at all – and I think a lot of [people] would find that very surprising."

Johnny Rotten wrote that "During the Pistols era, women were out there playing with the men, taking us on in equal terms ... It wasn't combative, but compatible." Chrissie Hynde echoed similar sentiments when discussing her start in the punk scene, "That was the beauty of the punk thing: sexual discrimination didn't exist in that scene." The anti-establishment stance of punk opened the space for women who were treated like outsiders in a male-dominated industry. Sonic Youth's Kim Gordon states, "I think women are natural anarchists, because you're always operating in a male framework." Others take issue with the notion of equal recognition, such as guitarist Viv Albertine, who stated that "the A&R men, the bouncers, the sound mixers, no one took us seriously. So, no, we got no respect anywhere we went. People just didn't want us around."

== History and context ==
Musicologist Caroline Polk O'Meara has written that female experience, feminism and taking a pro-woman stance empowered women's participation in punk rock beginning in the 1970s. In rock music, there has been a gendered "distinction between public (male) and private (female) participation" in music. "[S]everal scholars have argued that men exclude women from bands or from the bands' rehearsals, recordings, performances, and other social activities." "Women are mainly regarded as passive and private consumers of allegedly slick, prefabricated – hence, inferior – pop music..., excluding them from participating as high status rock musicians." One of the reasons that mixed gender bands were traditionally rare was that "bands operate as tight-knit units in which homosocial solidarity – social bonds between people of the same sex... – plays a crucial role." In the 1960s pop music scene, "[s]inging was sometimes an acceptable pastime for a girl, but playing an instrument...simply wasn't done."

In the UK, the Sex Discrimination Act of 1975 allowed women the same access to jobs as men. Some men thought that this legislation put them at a loss and felt that women were taking away positions that traditionally belonged to them. This, and the election of Margaret Thatcher, led many young women who felt disenfranchised to the punk rock music scene.

Suzi Quatro is considered to be a major influence in the early British punk culture. Quatro refused to be sexualized by the media and indirectly dealt with the issue of sexism by embracing a tough, rocker persona while producing music that could thrive in the mainstream. Bands like X-Ray Spex and the Slits took this feminist rock culture and combined it with a more extreme, aggressive style of music. This genre reflected on social, cultural and political changes of the United Kingdom at the time, and continued to do so in other locations.

In the US, women such as Exene Cervenka and Joan Jett made contributions to the Los Angeles punk scene in the late 1970s and early 1980s. Cervenka's aggressive style and her unconventional looks drew more young women to the scene since it was inclusive. Many of these women sought to fight public sexual harassment and encourage body positive attitudes through their music. Leather jackets, short skirts, fishnets and choker necklaces were part of the punk style and culture, and this style made many punk women targets for sexual harassment in the streets. They often spent much time outside waiting for shows, smoking, and meeting with one another, which created a kind of vulnerability. Women punk musicians retaliated by educating the young girls involved in the scene, taking legal action, and writing songs on the matter. While punk in New York City and San Francisco emerged in the 1970s, the Los Angeles scene was at its strongest point in the 1980s, as a response to the conservative policies of Ronald Reagan's administration. Mainstream rock such as Christopher Cross or Hall and Oates did not tend to address political issues, which left a space for rebels like Joan Jett and Blondie within the charts.

The feminist ideologies of punk rock in the 1970s and 1980s persevered into the 1990s via the riot grrrl movement in the Olympia, Washington, area. Riot grrrl addressed more than the sexism of punk culture alone. Rather, the movement applied feminism on a broader scale by taking on issues such as sexual assault, systematic sexism, and the idea that sex is taboo for women. Riot grrrl began by primarily using homemade magazines, known as zines, and group meetings.

Eventually, the movement developed into a genre of music that was more aggressive than the mainstream rock of the decade. This genre reflected the same values as the zines. It was within this era that the LGBT community began to use punk rock as an outlet for advocacy as well. Groups from the early 21st century such as Pussy Riot combine feminist and queer values in their music and films.

The constant push for gender equality over three decades has resulted in a more inclusive punk rock culture that is no longer divided by sex. No Doubt is one example of this accepting culture. They are a co-ed musical group with a female singer who addresses feminist issues. One of No Doubt's songs, "Just a Girl", made it to the Billboard Hot 100, peaking at number 23 back in 1995. Sleater-Kinney and Le Tigre are groups known to mix feminist ideologies with other social justice themes. Following George W. Bush's administration's response to the September 11 attacks and Hurricane Katrina, these female-led groups offered political criticism through politicized songs. Sleater-Kinney's song "Combat Rock" was anti-war in nature and directly criticized the U.S. government's decisions regarding the Middle East.

"The rebellion of rock music was largely a male rebellion; the women—often, in the 1950s and '60s, girls in their teens—in rock usually sang songs as personæ utterly dependent on their macho boyfriends". Philip Auslander says that "Although there were many women in rock by the late 1960s, most performed only as singers, a traditionally feminine position in popular music". Though some women played instruments in American all-female garage rock bands, none of these bands achieved more than regional success. So they "did not provide viable templates for women's on-going participation in rock". In relation to the gender composition of heavy metal bands, it has been said that "heavy metal performers are almost exclusively male", "at least until the mid-1980s", apart from "exceptions such as Girlschool." However, "now [in the 2010s] maybe more than ever–strong metal women have put up their dukes and got down to it", "carv[ing] out a considerable place for [them]selves."

When Suzi Quatro emerged in 1973, "no other prominent female musician worked in rock simultaneously as a singer, instrumentalist, songwriter, and bandleader". According to Auslander, she was "kicking down the male door in rock and roll and proving that a female musician ... and this is a point I am extremely concerned about ... could play as well if not better than the boys".

== Social change and activism ==
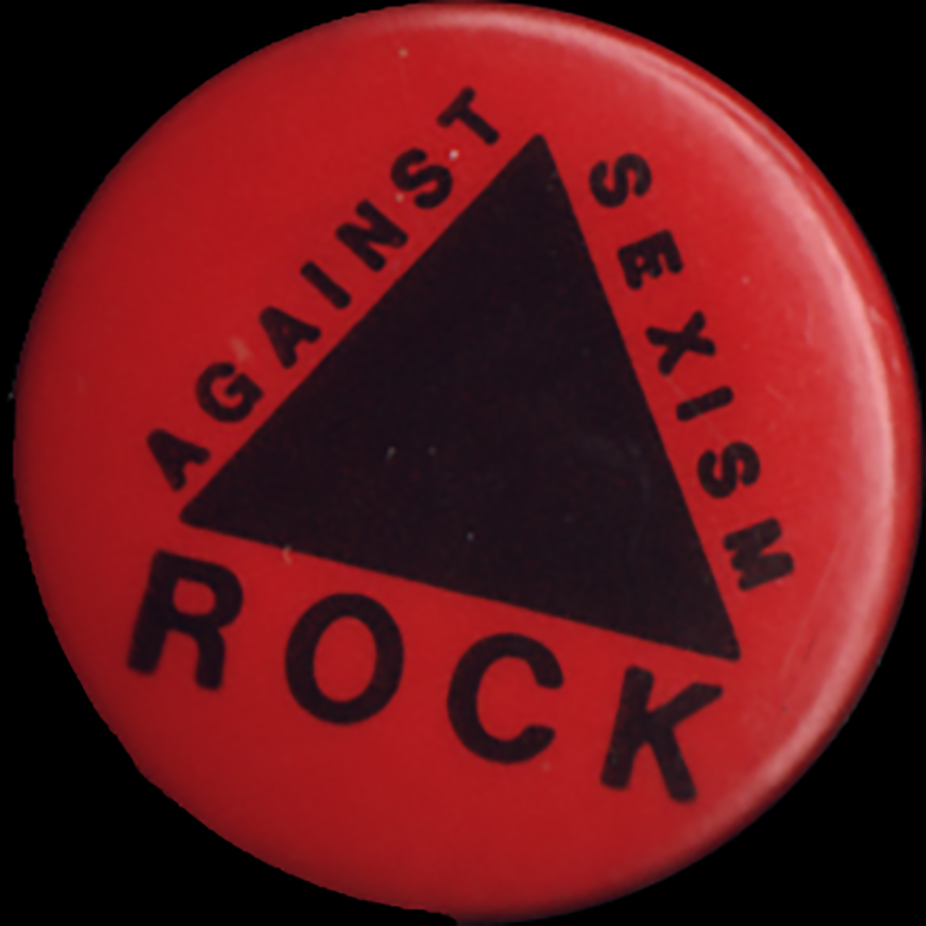
Rock Against Sexism badge

Rock Against Sexism (RAS) was a political and cultural movement dedicated to promoting women in music, and challenging sexism and heterosexism in the rock music community, pop culture and in the world at large. It was primarily a part of the punk rock music and arts scene. RAS began in the UK in 1978, and by the mid-1980s also had a presence in North America. It was inspired and influenced by Rock Against Racism; the two movements had many of the same participants. RAS has been cited as a prototype for, and influence on, the later riot grrrl movement, "giving women more access to punk subculture."

The Mexico City-based punk rock collective Hijas de Violencia (the Daughters of Violence) conduct street performances to combat sexual harassment against women. A precursor was Chavas Activas Punks (CHAPS), a women's collective that formed in the Mexico City pun community in 1987. The anthropologist Maritza Urteaga Castro-Prozo writes of their protests against the "hostility and rejection they experienced from male counterparts" that, while they had "little acquaintance with feminist theory", their lyrics and fanzine focused on gender discrimination and sexuality.

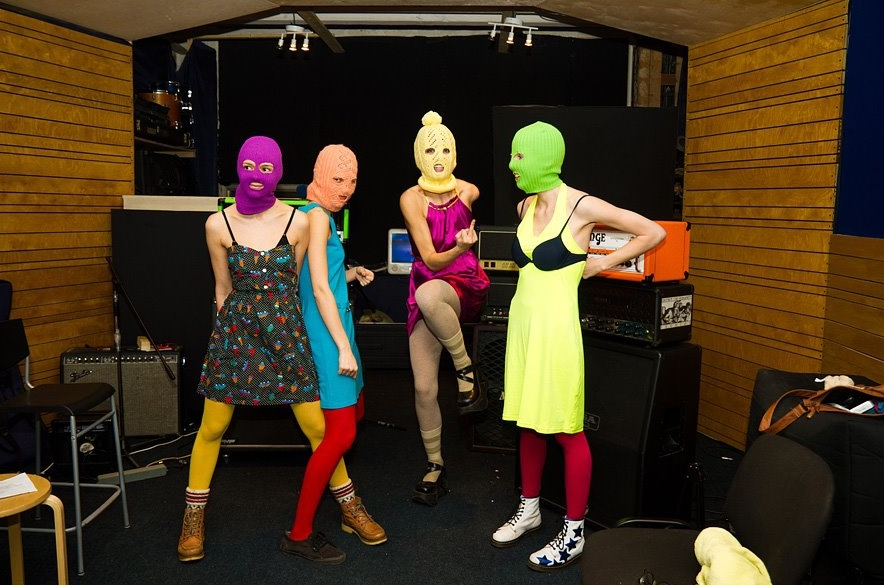
Pussy Riot, 2012

Pussy Riot's lyrical themes include feminism, LGBT rights, and government opposition. The collective considers Russian President Vladimir Putin to be a dictator, and opposes his policies.

Some women in punk rock have used their music and lyrics as platforms for feminist ideologies, and to oppose the sexualization of female musicians and societal policing of women's bodies and sexual agency. As early as the 1960s, women in rock were often considered as sex objects and their capabilities and talent were often undermined while male producers were credited for their music. Some female punk and riot grrrl lyrics called for women to challenge the patriarchy and rape culture, such as 7 Year Bitch's song "Dead Men Don't Rape". Bikini Kill expressed the need for a revolution in pursuit of disrupting the patriarchy, for example their song "Rebel Girl". Some musicians lyrics expressed themes of queer liberation, as in Gossip's "Where the Girls Are". Conventional expectations of women's roles were challenged, for example, in the Slits' "Typical Girls", that sarcastically addressed stereotypes of women as being "too emotional". Riot grrrl artists and their punk predecessors not only fought for women, but for the LGBTQIA+ community, animal rights, and human rights in general. Punk, as non-normative as it has traditionally been, has (in some cases) become a safe haven for many unaccepted individuals, including queer people. Punks and the punk lifestyle are often outside of the realm of normative culture, and the same can be said for queer individuals. The discomfort in this outcast identity may bring feelings of solidarity for people in punk scenes, queer and otherwise.

== Fashion ==
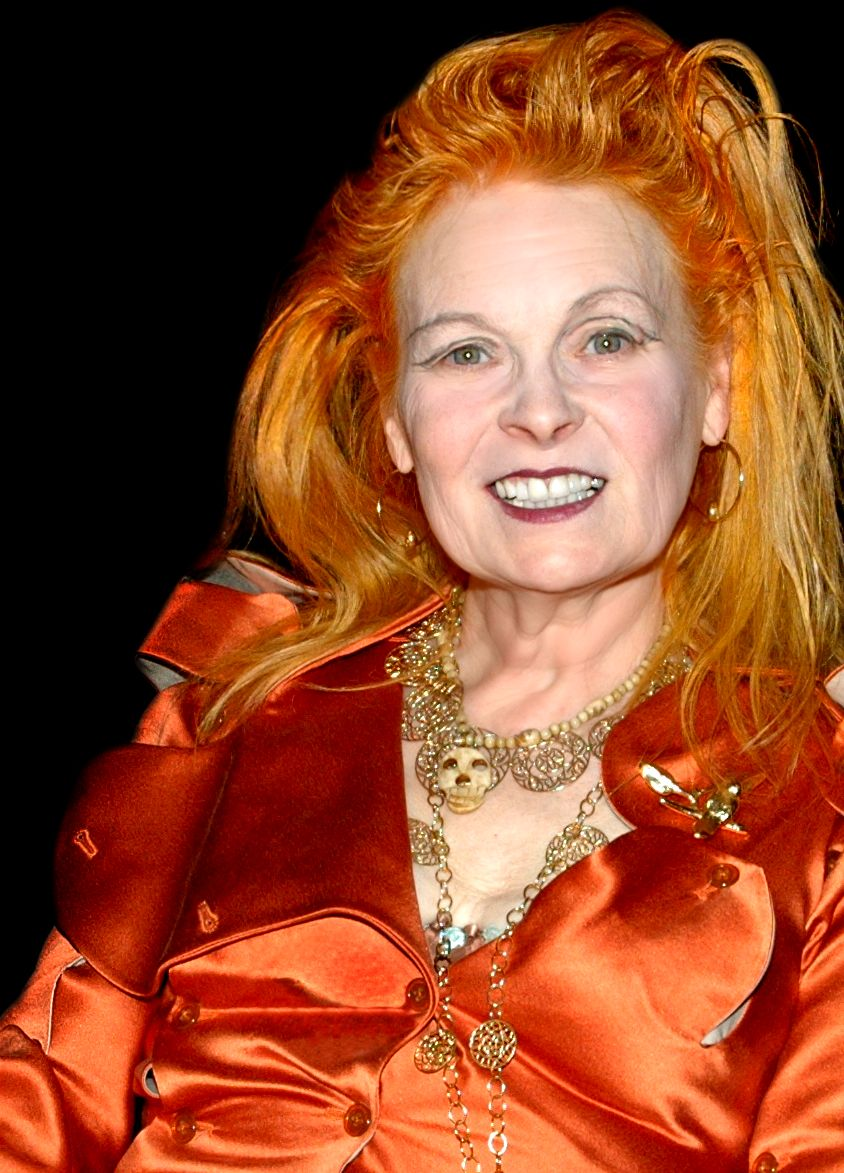
Vivienne Westwood, 2008

Vivienne Westwood was a designer associated with early UK punk fashion in the 1970s who made clothes for Malcolm McLaren's boutique in the King's Road, London, which became famous as "SEX". Other designers included Wendy Gawitz and Kate Buck of "Eccentric Clothing", a shop that opened in 1980 in Collingwood, Melbourne, Australia, as well as designers Julie Purvis and Jillian Burt, and fellow Australians Kate Durham and Sara Thorn.

Pamela Rooke, also known as Jordan Mooney or simply Jordan, worked as a model for Vivienne Westwood's Sex boutique to create an iconic image of punk fashion "style" during the 1970s. She later went on to manage the band Adam and the Ants.

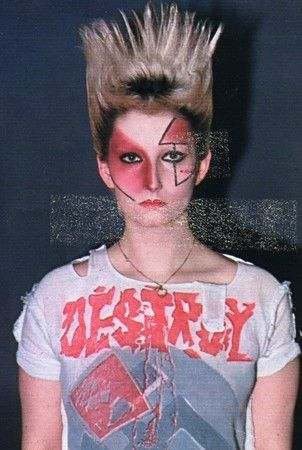
Jordan Mooney

Women in the hardcore punk scene typically wore army pants, band T-shirts, and hooded sweatshirts. The style of the 1980s hardcore scene contrasted with the more provocative fashion styles of late 1970s punk rockers (elaborate hairdos, torn clothes, patches, safety pins, studs, spikes, etc.).

In 2013 the Metropolitan Museum of Art in New York organized the historical exhibition, PUNK: Chaos to Couture, featuring clothing worn and/or fabricated by punk musicians, as well as designers such as Vivenne Westwood, Rodarte, Ann Demeulemeester, Katharine Hamnett and others. A comprehensive exhibition catalog, designed by Pentagram, was produced by the museum and distributed by Yale University Press.

== Visual art ==
Linder Sterling, commonly known as Linder, was the former front-woman of the post-punk band Ludus. She is primarily known for her radical feminist visual artwork, photographs, photomontages, and cover art for the band the Buzzcocks.

Visual artists Gee Vaucher and her partner Penny Rimbaud were both members of the anarcho-punk band Crass. Vaucher's collages and paintings defined the aesthetic of the band and were instrumental to the 'protest art' of the 1980s. She considers her artwork as a tool for social change; and works from a feminist and anarcho-pacifist point of view.

== Significant musical artists ==
=== 1970s ===
==== Patti Smith ====
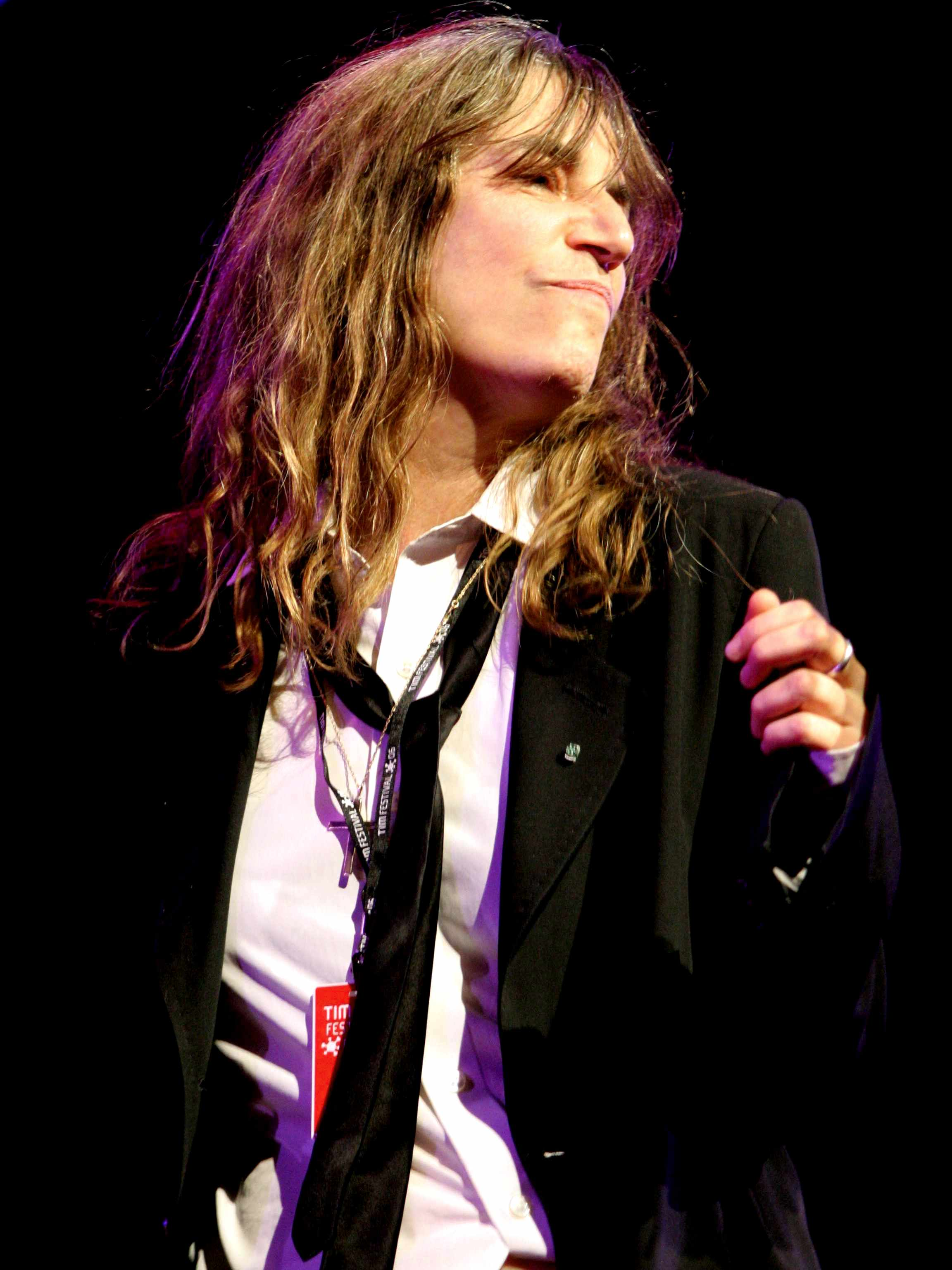
Patti Smith performing at TIM Festival, Marina da Gloria, Rio de Janeiro

Patti Smith (born 1946) is a New York City-based punk rock singer-songwriter, poet and artist, whose first album, Horses (1975), significantly influenced the New York City punk rock genre. Smith's work went on to receive international recognition. In 2007 she was inducted into the Rock and Roll Hall of Fame. She was born Patricia Lee Smith in Chicago, Illinois.

==== Chrissie Hynde ====
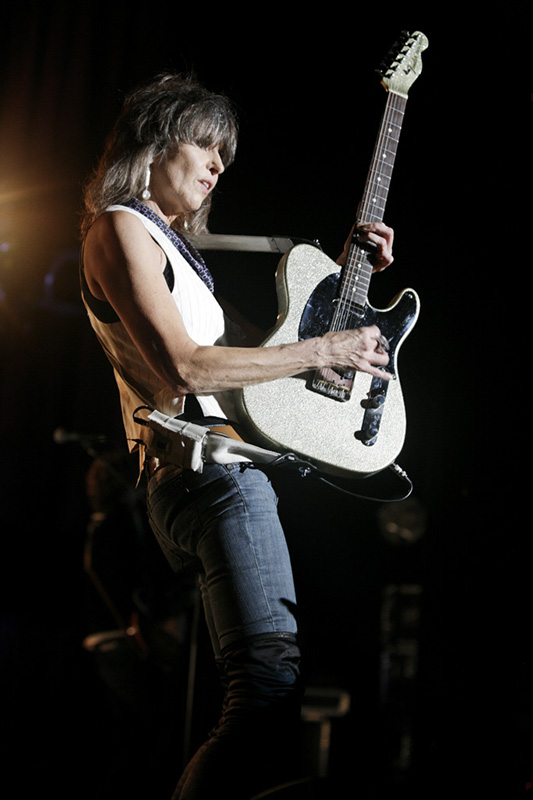
Chrissie Hynde, 2013

Chrissie Hynde (born 1951 in Akron, Ohio) is a singer, songwriter and guitar player and co-founder of the band the Pretenders. They were inducted into the Rock and Roll Hall of Fame in 2005.

==== Siouxsie Sioux ====
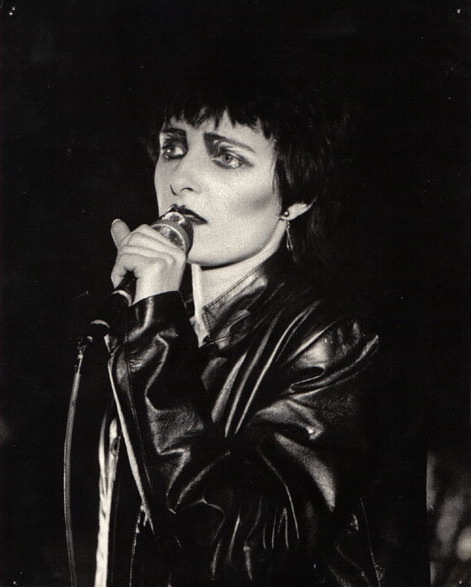
Siouxie Sioux, 1980

Born Susan Janet Ballion in 1957 in Southwark, London, England, Siouxsie Sioux is best known as the lead singer of Siouxsie and the Banshees, which released 11 studio albums. She continued to tour with the Creatures before embarking on a solo career.

==== Nina Hagen ====
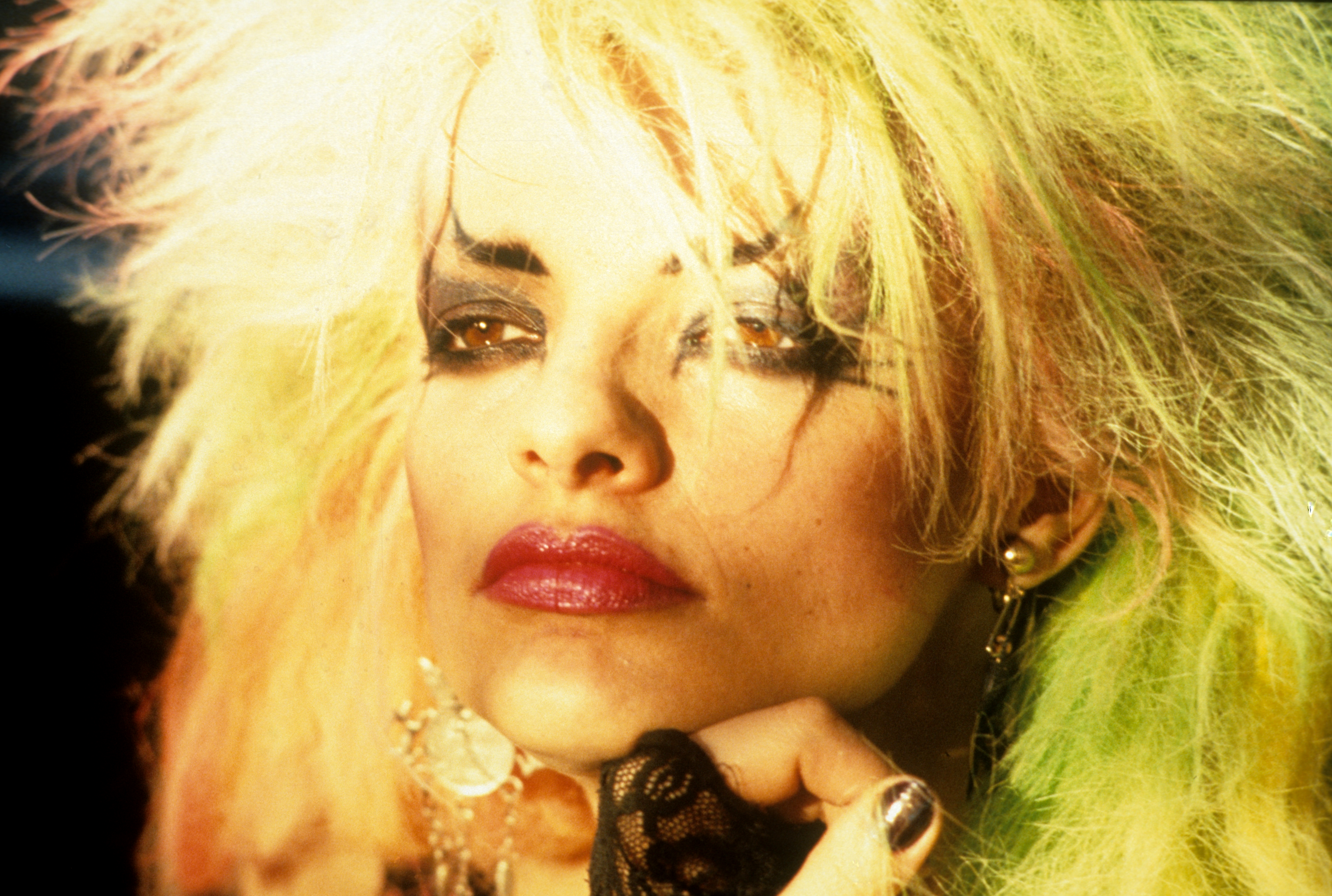
Nina Hagen, 1981

Catharina Hagen (born 1955), known as Nina Hagen, is a singer and songwriter born in East Berlin, German Democratic Republic. After she emigrated to West Germany in 1976, she joined the band Spliff in West Berlin, and together they named themselves Nina Hagen Band. They released two studio albums, Nina Hagen Band and Unbehagen. She left the band in 1979 and became a solo artist, releasing her first solo album, NunSexMonkRock, in 1982. This was followed by the albums Fearless (1983) and In Ekstasy (1985).

==== Exene Cervenka ====
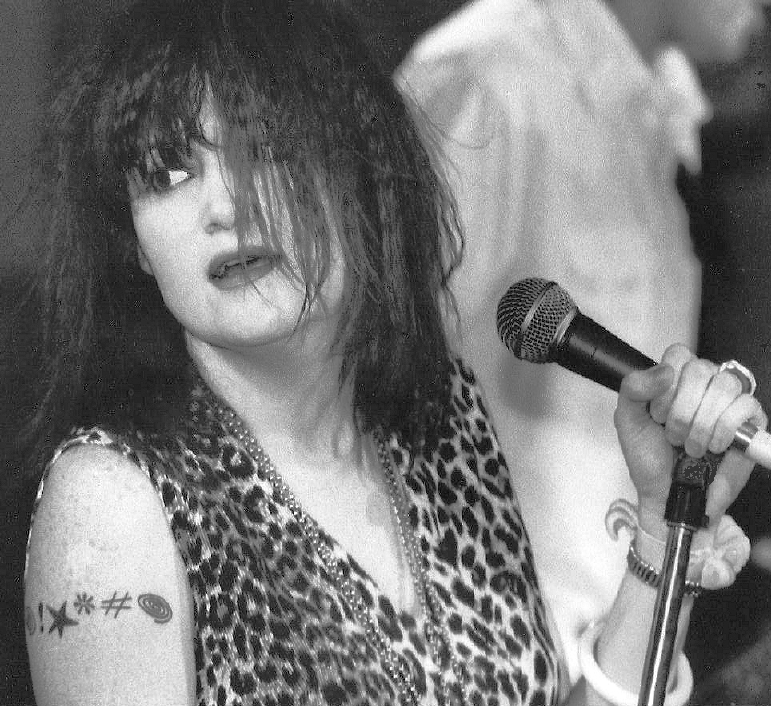
Exene Cervenka, 1986

Exene Cervenka co-founded the band X in 1977, with bassist John Doe, guitarist Billy Zoom and drummer DJ Bonebrake. Their debut album Los Angeles (1980) established her as a presence as one of the most influential vocalists in the punk rock movement.

==== Joan Jett ====
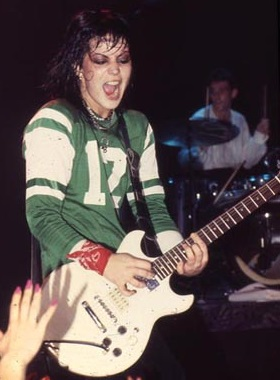
Joan Jett

Joan Jett, born Joan Marie Larkin, began her career when she was still in high school as the rhythm guitarist and later lead singer for the all-female band the Runaways; their work included the 1976 song "Cherry Bomb" and the 1977 album Queens of Noise. In the 1980s she founded her own independent label, Blackheart Records. In 2015 she was inducted into the Rock and Roll Hall of Fame.

==== Lydia Lunch ====
Lydia Lunch, began her career as the frontwoman for the band Teenage Jesus and the Jerks, and went on to collaborate with numerous other musicians and bands, including Nick Cave, Sonic Youth, and Brian Eno, among others.

==== Poly Styrene ====
Poly Styrene (1957–2011), born Marianne Joan Elliott-Said, founded the punk band X-Ray Spex. The band's 1978 album Germfree Adolescents established her as a front woman, singer-songwriter and musician.

==== Ari Up ====
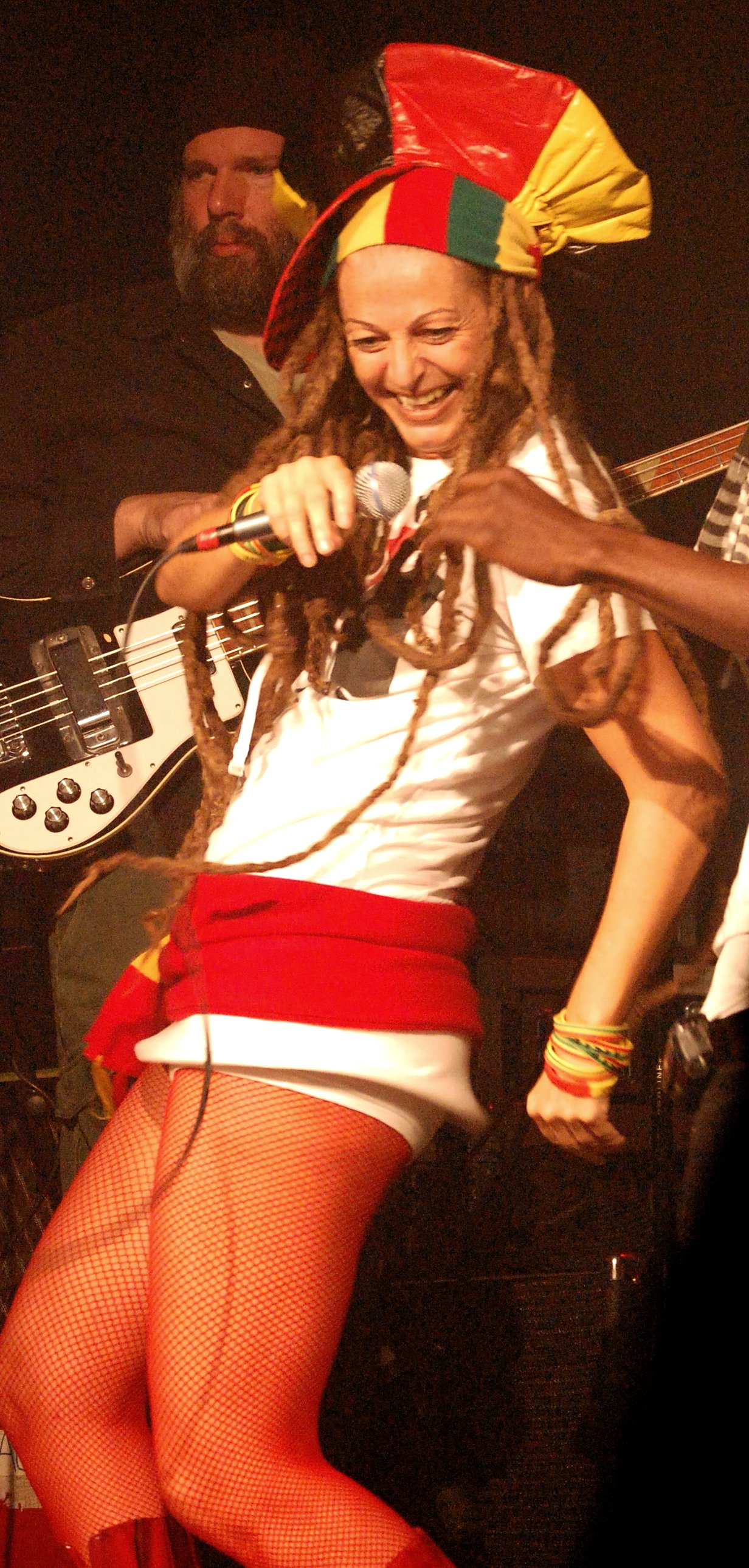
Ari Up

Ari Up (1962–2010) was born Ariane Daniela Forster in Munich, West Germany, and was a vocalist and member of the Slits, a British punk rock band. She was only 14 years old when she became the Slits' frontwoman in 1976, and was known as the most flamboyant and eccentric member of the group. She took guitar lessons from Joe Strummer of the Clash. Up's mother was the music promoter Nora Forster, a publishing heiress of the German newspaper Der Tagesspiegel whose home became a crash pad and meeting place for many rock musicians, and who financially helped support the Slits, the Sex Pistols and the Clash. Ari Up grew up within this creative milieu where she was raised by Forster and John Lydon.

==== Gaye Advert ====
British born Gaye Advert, also known as Gaye Black, was the bass player for the Adverts. She has been called "one of punk's first female icons", and the "first female punk star".

==== Palmolive ====
Paloma McLardy (born 1955) is known as the drummer and songwriter for the Slits, as Palmolive. Born in Spain, she moved to London in 1972 to live in the squats with other counter-cultural youths. In London, she befriended Joe Strummer of the Clash, who introduced her to Sid Vicious, bass player for the Sex Pistols. Through these alliances she joined the band the Flowers of Romance with guitarist Viv Albertine. Having met 14-year-old Ari Up at a Patti Smith concert, they formed the all-women punk band the Slits, playing gigs with the Clash, the Sex Pistols, the Buzzcocks, and others. In 1979, she joined the all-female punk band the Raincoats, who recorded their self-titled debut album for Rough Trade Records.

==== Poison Ivy ====
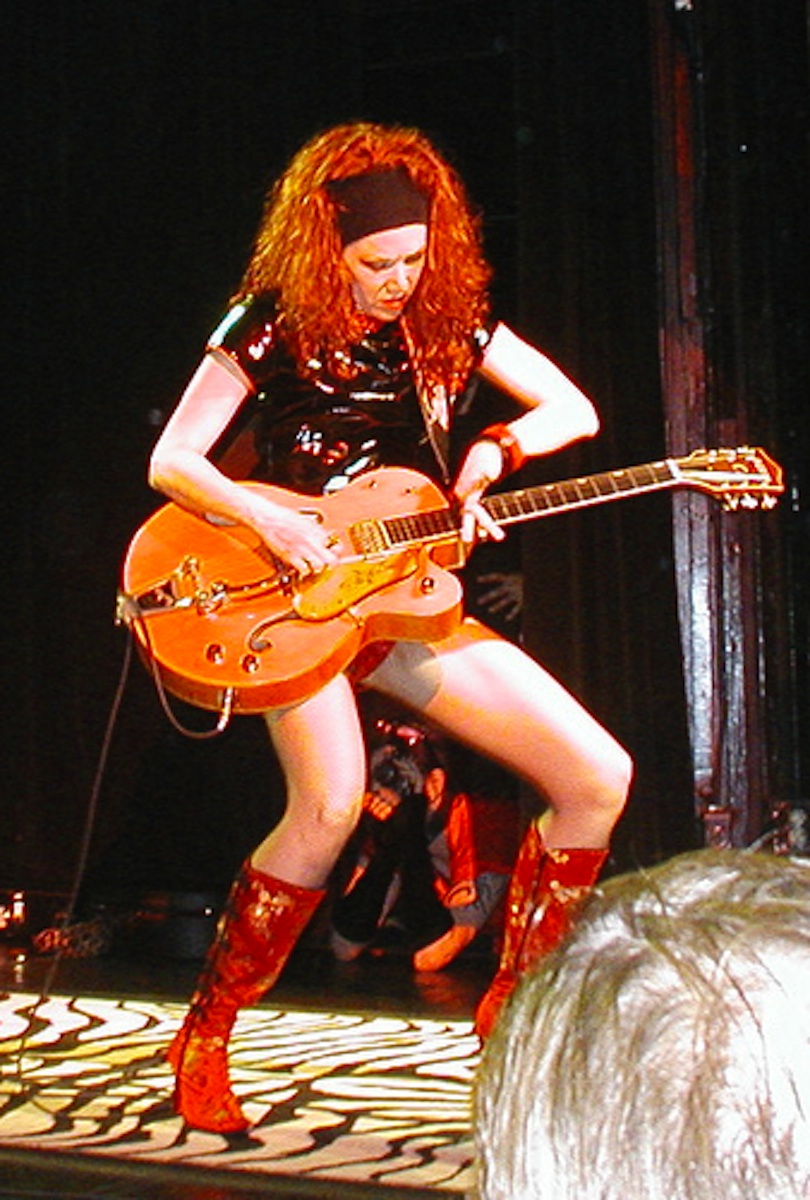
Poison Ivy, 2005

Poison Ivy (born Kristy Marlana Wallace in 1953) is known for her work as a guitarist and songwriter who co-founded the American punk-rockabilly band the Cramps. Also known as Poison Ivy Rorschach, she also provided vocals, arranged songs and produced many of the band's records. She met Lux Interior (born Erick Lee Purkhiser) at Sacramento State College in 1972, who became the singer for the Cramps, whose work gained a cult following as well as some commercial success in Europe.

==== Debbie Harry ====
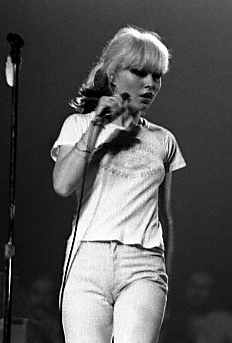
Debbie Harry performing with Blondie, 1977

Debbie Harry is one of the most commercially successful musicians of punk rock/new wave. Her band, Blondie, often performed at CBGB in New York City, and their 1978 album Parallel Lines is considered a punk-pop classic. Blondie was inducted into the Rock and Roll Hall of Fame in 2006.

==== Viv Albertine ====
Viv Albertine (born 1954, in Sydney, Australia) is a guitarist and singer for the British punk band the Slits. Albertine was part of the inner circle of the punk bands the Clash and the Sex Pistols, and joined the Slits in 1977. She has also played with the post-punk band Flying Lizards, the dubstep-influenced New Age Steppers and the punk band the Flowers of Romance.

==== Belinda Carlisle ====
Belinda Carlisle's first venture into punk rock music was in 1977 as drummer for the band the Germs, under the name Dottie Danger. She was recruited into the band by Lorna Doom. Soon after leaving the Germs, she co-founded the Go-Go's (originally named the Misfits), with Margot Olavarria, Elissa Bello, and Jane Wiedlin. After Olavarria and Bello's departure from the band, the new line-up included bassist-turned-guitarist Charlotte Caffey, guitarist-turned-bassist Kathy Valentine, and drummer Gina Schock.

==== Other 1970s artists ====
- Alice Bag
- Barbara Ess
- Bush Tetras
- Cherie Currie
- Cherry Vanilla
- Delta 5
- Edith Nylon
- Elli Medeiros
- Essential Logic
- Fay Fife
- Honey Bane
- Gee Vaucher
- Gina Birch
- Jackie Fox
- Jayne County
- Jordan
- Kate Korus (fr)
- Lene Lovich
- Lora Logic
- Lorna Doom
- Marie Currie
- Neo Boys
- The Nixe
- Pat Place
- Patricia Morrison
- Pauline Murray
- Penelope Houston
- Phew
- Phranc
- Shanne Bradley
- Suzi Gutsy (fr)
- Tessa Pollitt
- Toyah
- The Dishrags
- The Raincoats
- Vi Subversa
- Vivien Goldman

=== 1980s ===
Tina Bell

==== Lene Lovich ====
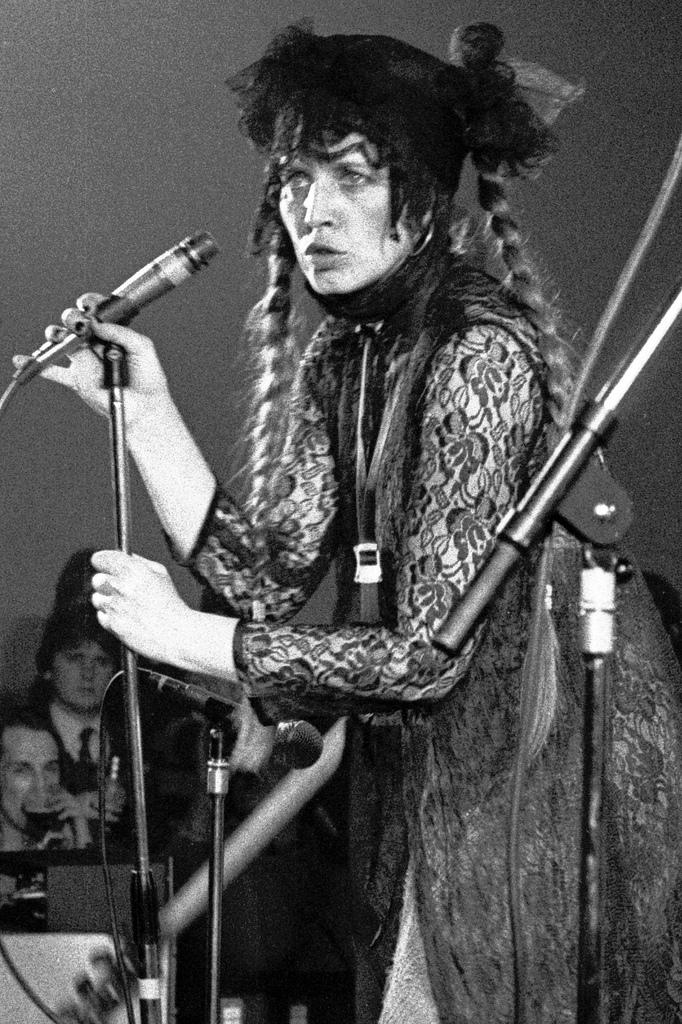
Lene Lovich, 1979

Lene Lovich is an American-born English singer, known for her idiosyncratic vocal style. Although active in 1978 and 1979, much of her success was in the 1980s. Her debut studio album, Stateless (1978), produced the single "Lucky Number". She released two more albums, Flex (1979) and No Man's Land (1982), on Stiff Records. In 1989, she independently released the album March, before her 15-year hiatus from music.

==== Kim Gordon ====
The American bassist and singer Kim Gordon (born 1953) was a founding member of the band Sonic Youth in 1981, which established her as an important presence in the downtown New York City music scene. She wrote and performed music with Sonic Youth through 2012. Her memoir Girl in a Band was published in 2015.

==== Lydia Lunch ====
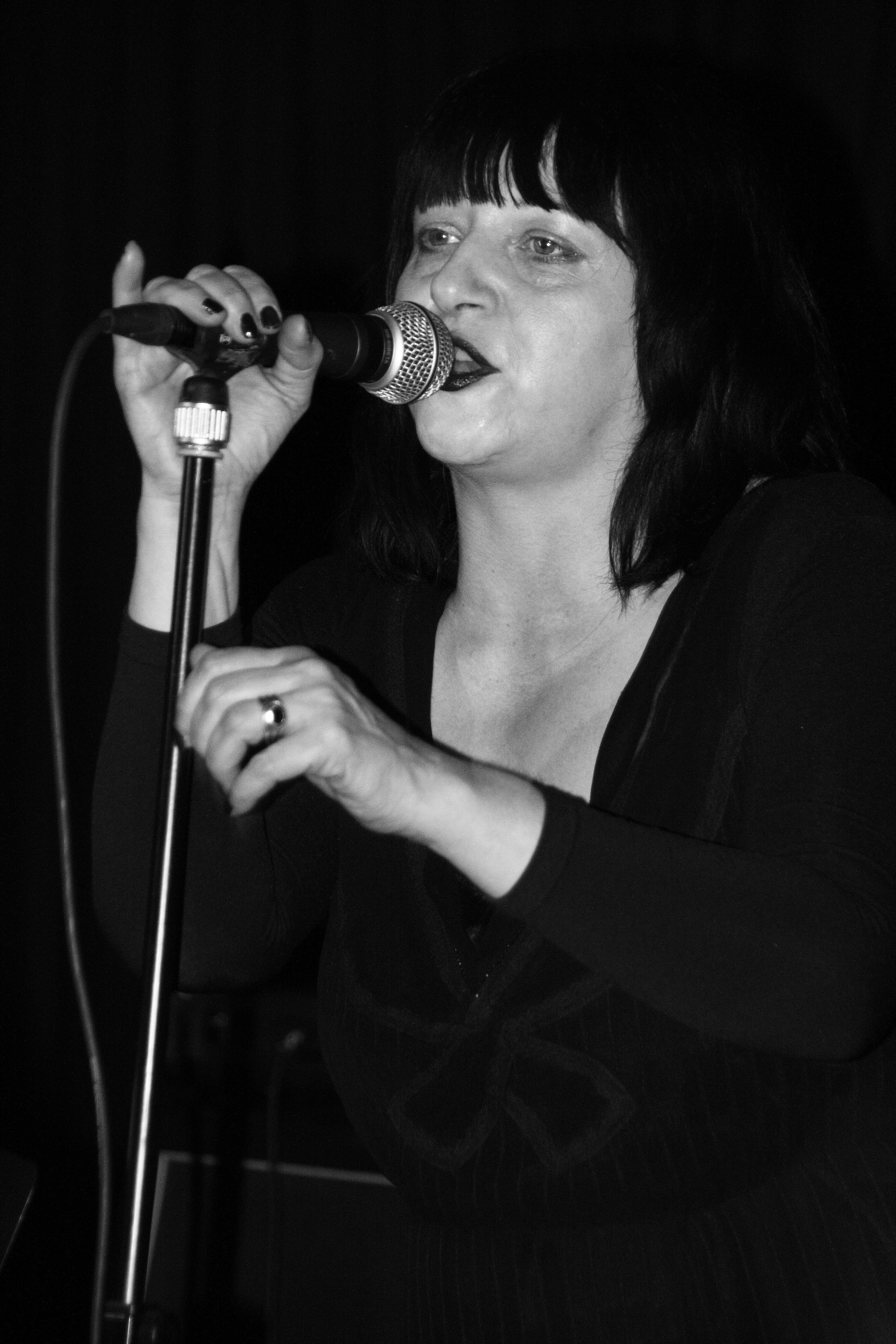
Lydia Lunch, 2011

Lydia Lunch (born 1959) is a US punk rock and no wave singer. Her career was established with the founding of Teenage Jesus and the Jerks in collaboration with James Chance. In the mid-1980s she formed Widowspeak, a recording and publishing company.

==== Tina Bell ====
Singer and songwriter of the Seattle-based punk and grunge band Bam Bam. Bell has been called the "Godmother of Grunge". According to Stewart Yamazaki of The Seattle Times, "The legacy of Bell, a Black woman, has often been overlooked in a genre typically associated with long-haired white guys."

==== Wendy O. Williams ====
Wendy O. Williams (1949–1998) was the lead singer and songwriter for the punk band Plasmatics, whose performances included such actions as chain-sawing guitars and blowing up equipment on stage.

==== Debora Iyall ====
Debora Iyall was the lead singer in the San Francisco-based punk band Romeo Void. She was born in Washington state and is of Cowlitz Native American heritage. She is known for her skills as a lyricist whose "searing imagery" explores themes like sexuality and alienation from a female perspective.

==== Shonen Knife ====
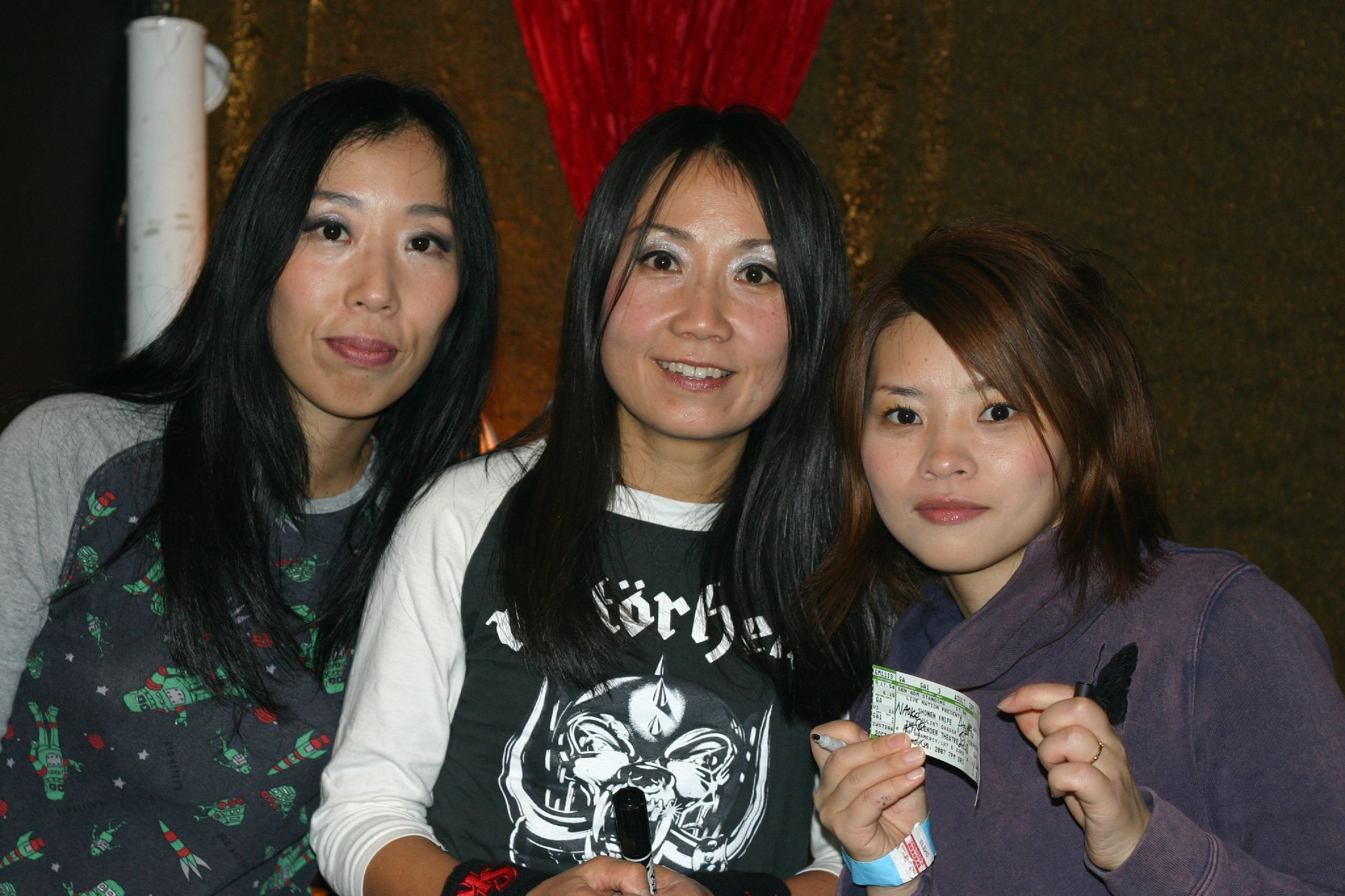
Shonen Knife

Shonen Knife is a Japanese garage-pop punk band influenced by the girl groups of the 1960s. Current members include Naoko Yamano, Ritsuko Taneda, Atsuko Yamano, Risa Kawano, Naru Ishizuka. Former members of the band include Michie Nakatani, Mana Nishiura, Etsuko Nakanishi and Emi Morimoto.

==== Other 1980s artists ====
- April Palmieri
- Au Pairs
- Beki Bondage
- Brix Smith
- Caroline Azar
- Chalk Circle
- Dee Plakas
- Dolly Mixture
- Eve Libertine
- Donita Sparks
- Fifth Column
- Fire Party
- Helen McCookerybook
- Honey Bane
- Jane Dornacker, Leila and the Snakes
- Jean Smith
- Jennifer Finch
- Joy De Vivre
- June Miles-Kingston
- Julie "Jules" Lanfeld, Sin 34
- Kim Shattuck, the Muffs
- Kira Roessler
- L7
- LiLiPUT (formerly Kleenex)
- Little Annie a.k.a. Annie Anxiety/Bandez
- Marine Girls
- Mia Zapata
- Mo-dettes
- Nina Childress
- Rubella Ballet
- Sara Lee
- Sugar Babydoll
- Su Tissue
- Suzi Gardner
- Teresa Taylor
- The 5.6.7.8's
- The Belle Stars
- The Go-Go's
- The Gymslips
- Toyah
- Vi Subversa
- Vulpes
- Yanka Dyagileva

=== 1990s ===
==== Riot grrrl ====
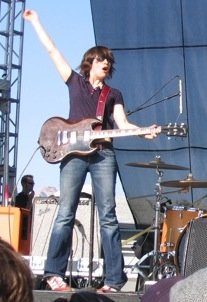
Carrie Brownstein in 2005

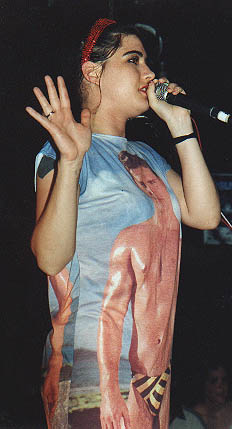
Kathleen Hanna of Bikini Kill in 1996

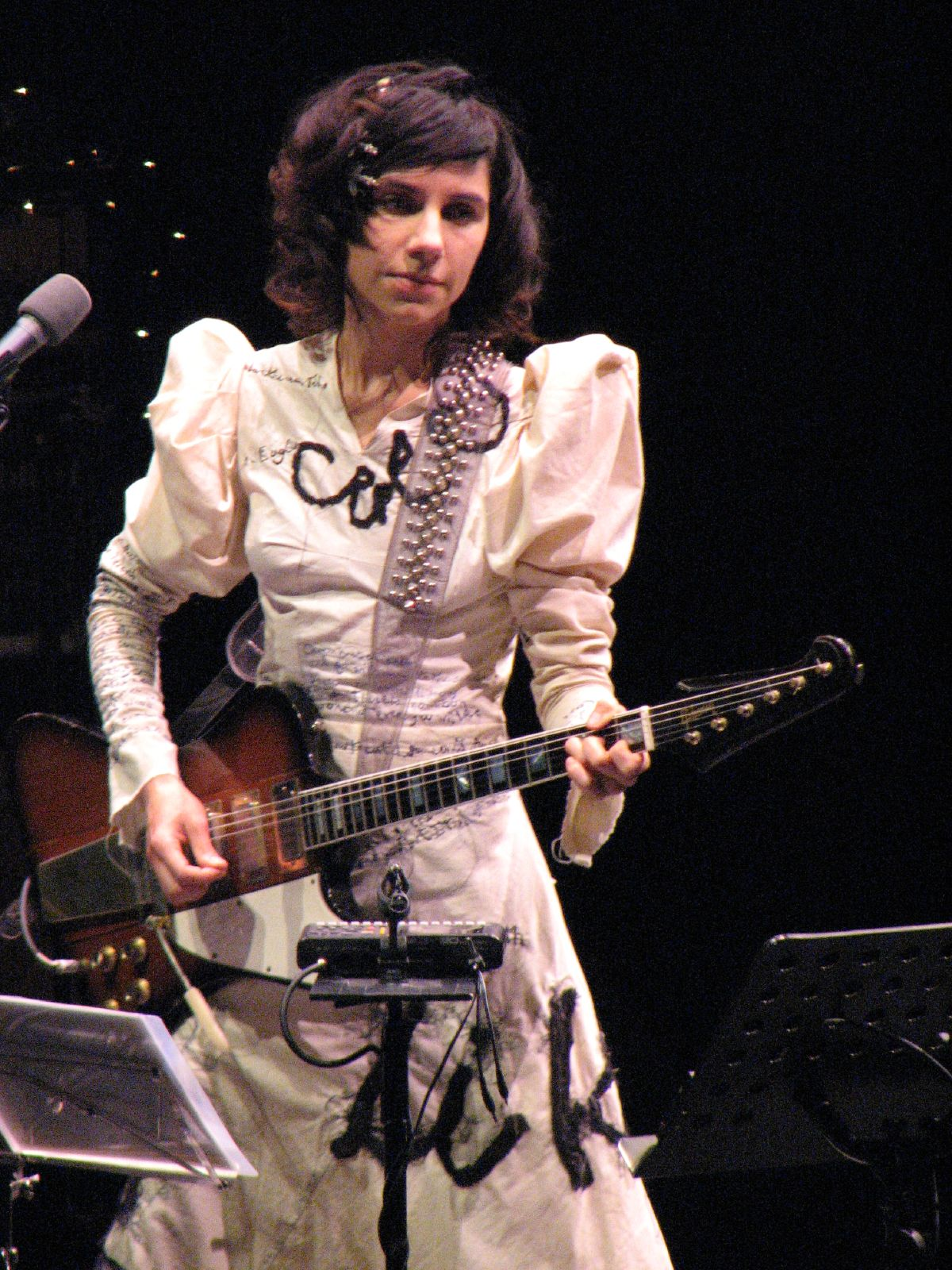
PJ Harvey in 2007

Riot grrrl is an underground feminist hardcore punk movement that originally started in the early 1990s, in Washington, D.C., and the greater Pacific Northwest, noticeably in Olympia, Washington. It is often associated with third-wave feminism, which is sometimes seen as its starting point. It has also been described as a musical genre that came out of indie rock, with the punk scene serving as an inspiration for a musical movement in which women could express themselves in the same way men had been doing for the past several years.

Riot grrrl bands often address issues such as rape, domestic abuse, sexuality, racism, patriarchy, and female empowerment. Bands associated with the movement include Bikini Kill, Bratmobile, Heavens to Betsy, Excuse 17, Huggy Bear, Cake Like, Skinned Teen, Emily's Sassy Lime, Sleater-Kinney, and also queercore groups like Team Dresch. In addition to a music scene and genre, riot grrrl is a subculture involving a DIY ethic, zines, art, political action, and activism. Riot grrrls are known to hold meetings, start chapters, and support and organize women in music.

Some groups that participated in the riot grrrl movement encouraged men to stand near the back during concerts to allow women their own space near the front. Many members of the punk rock community considered this and other methods of riot grrrl to be too radical. Due to this, another feminist movement emerged in the East Bay. One group, Spitboy, pushed their feminist values through integration rather than division. They played at venues such as 924 Gilman Street, which banned sexism and sexual harassment.

==== Kathleen Hanna ====
Kathleen Hanna (born 1968) and Tobi Vail co-founded the band Bikini Kill, establishing the feminist riot grrrl movement. Hanna has also released an album under the name Julie Ruin, which developed into Le Tigre.

==== PJ Harvey ====
PJ Harvey (born 1969) is an English performer associated with the punk blues and alternative rock genres.

==== The Breeders ====
The Breeders are an American band formed in 1990 by Kim Deal of the Pixies, her twin sister Kelley Deal and Tanya Donelly of Throwing Muses. The band has experienced a number of lineup changes; Kim Deal has been the band's sole continual member. Their first album, Pod (1990), though not commercially successful, received wide critical acclaim. The Breeders' most successful album, Last Splash (1993), is best known for the hit single "Cannonball".

==== Elastica ====
Elastica were an English band best known for their 1995 album Elastica, which produced singles that charted in the United Kingdom and the United States.

==== Republica ====
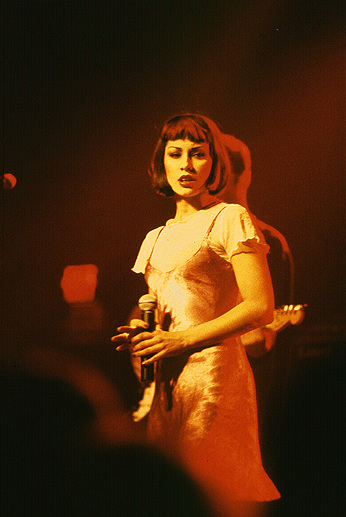
Saffron of Republica, 1996

Republica are an English band formed in 1994, featuring their lead singer Saffron. Republica are best known for their hit single "Ready to Go". Their music is described as dance punk or technopop punk rock.

==== Hole ====
Hole was formed in Los Angeles in 1989 by singer and guitarist Courtney Love and lead guitarist Eric Erlandson. The band had a revolving line-up of bassists and drummers, their most prolific being drummer Patty Schemel, and bassists Kristen Pfaff (d. 1994) and Melissa Auf der Maur.

==== Babes in Toyland ====
Babes in Toyland was a Minneapolis-based American punk rock band most active from 1987 to 2001, and reunited from 2014 to 2020. Vocalist and guitarist Kat Bjelland, founded the band with drummer Lori Barbero and bassist Michelle Leon. In 1992, Leon was replaced by Maureen Herman. They are best known for their albums Spanking Machine (1990), Fontanelle (1992) and Nemesisters (1995).

==== Other 1990s artists ====
- 7 Year Bitch
- Autoclave
- Becca Albee
- Bif Naked
- Christina Billotte
- Corin Tucker
- Fabulous Disaster
- Free Kitten
- Heavens to Betsy
- Huggy Bear
- Janet Weiss
- Jody Bleyle
- Kaia Wilson
- Kat Bjelland
- Katastrophy Wife (fr)
- Lunachicks
- L7
- Nomy Lamm
- Quix*o*tic
- Shirley Manson
- Slant 6
- Spitboy
- The Donnas
- Theo Kogan
- Tilt – Cinder Block

=== 2000s ===
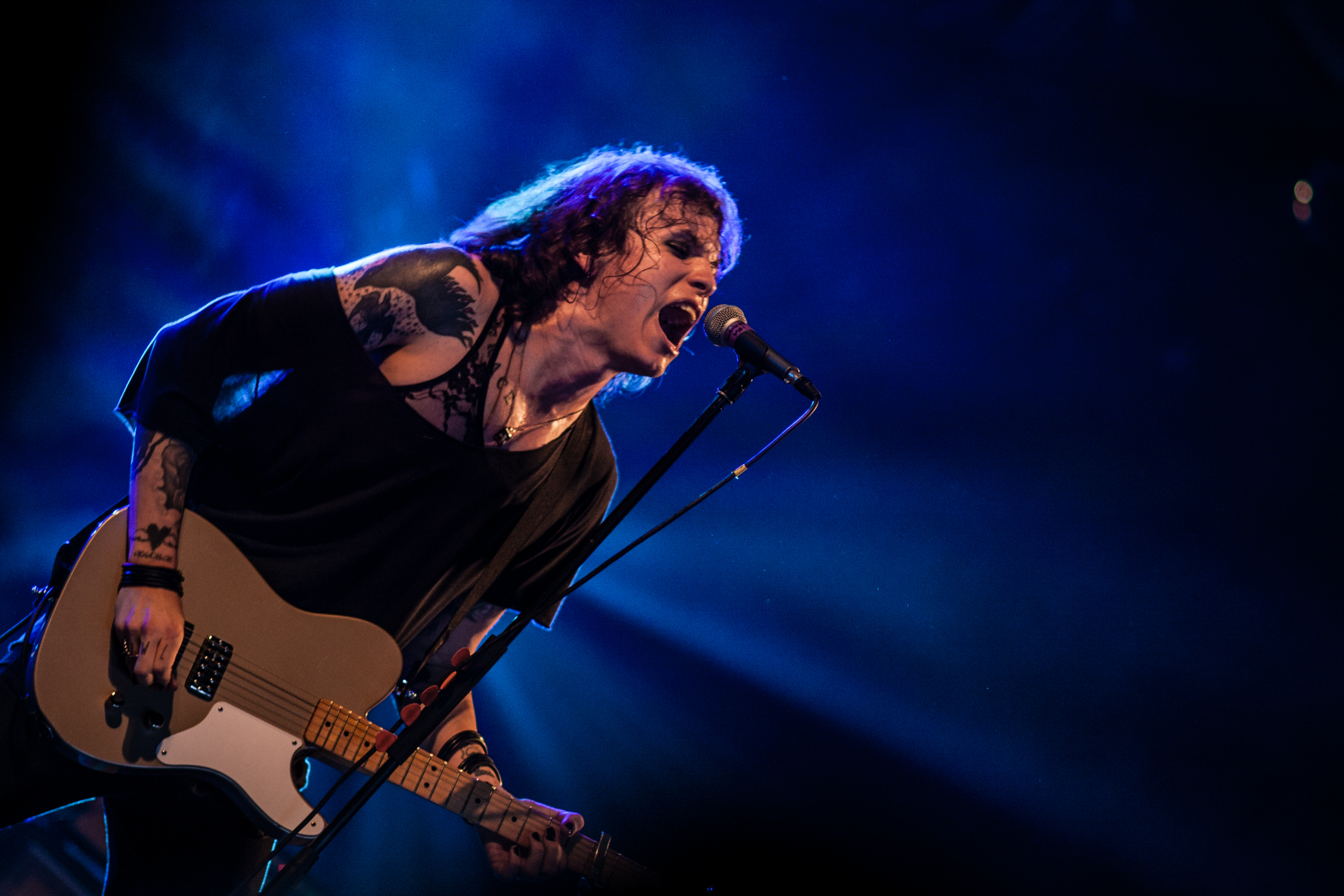
Laura Jane Grace of Against Me!, 2012

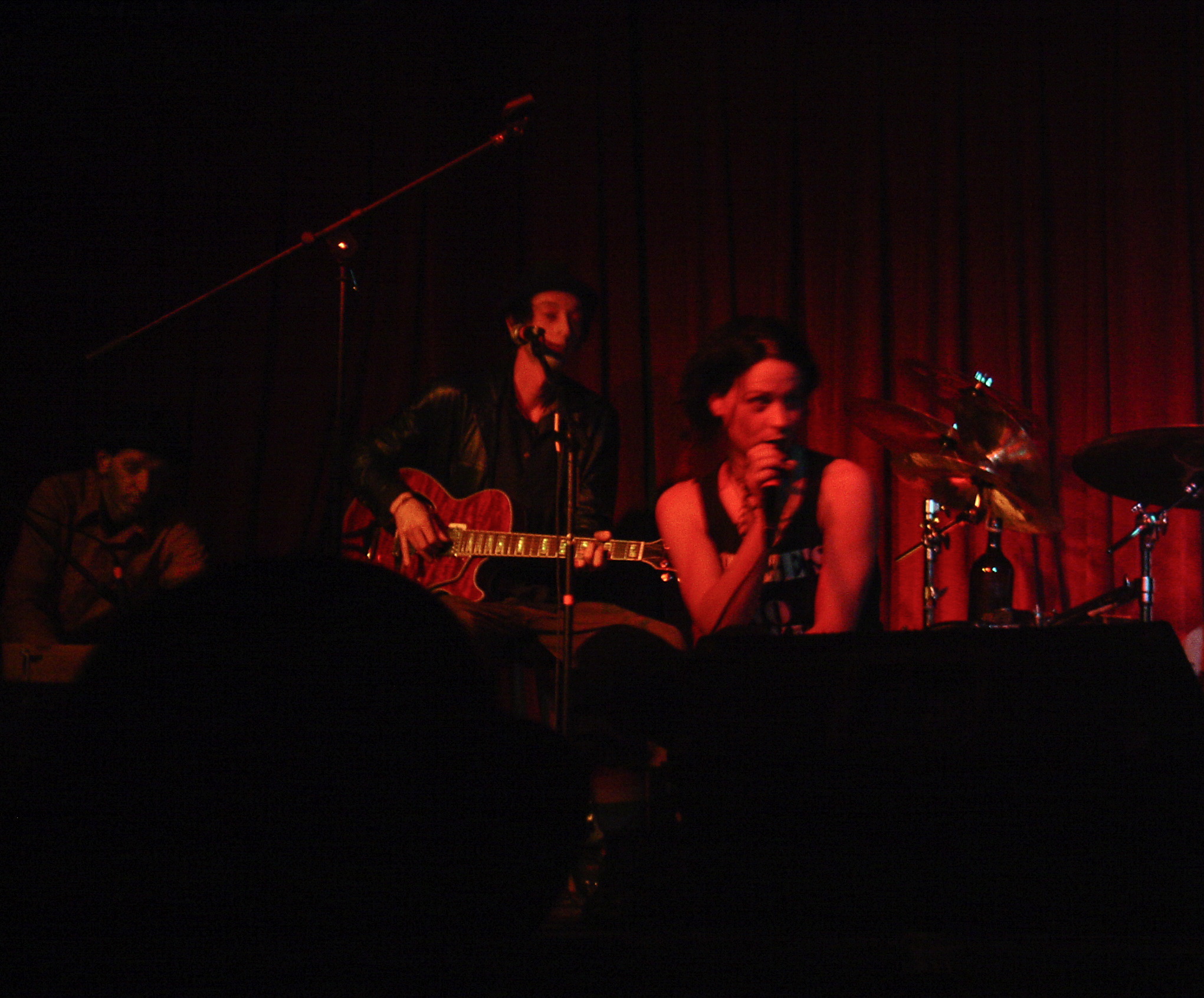
Holly Brewer of H.U.M.A.N.W.I.N.E., 2006

The first Ladyfest was held in August 2000, a DIY collectively organised festival of women in grassroots, punk and DIY music. Ladyfest was at its height in this era with few being held in the present day.

==== Karen O ====
Karen Lee Orzolek (born 1978) rose to prominence as the lead vocalist of Yeah Yeah Yeahs, becoming a key artist of the 2000s garage rock and post-punk revivals, and standing at the forefront of the New York music scene. She is known for her energetic live performances, distinctive singing style, and unique fashion sense.

==== Carrie Brownstein ====
Carrie Brownstein (born 1974) rose to prominence by establishing the riot grrrl all-women punk band Sleater-Kinney with Corin Tucker and Janet Weiss. During the early 2010s, Brownstein and Weiss were members of the band Wild Flag.

==== Laura Jane Grace ====
Laura Jane Grace (born 1980) is an American transgender musician who is the founder, guitarist, lead singer, and songwriter of the punk band Against Me!

==== Brody Dalle ====
Australian-born singer-songwriter and guitarist, leader of the Distillers and Spinnerette.

==== Other 2000s artists ====
Other prominent female punk related artists, bands and individuals from this era include Beth Ditto, Vivian Girls, Tacocat, P.S. Eliot, Bleach, Holly Brewer, Jemina Pearl, Mika Miko, Nü Sensae, Retching Red, the Bombpops, Regina Zernay Roberts, the Coathangers, Flamingo 50 and Akiko "Keex" Matsuura.

=== 2010s ===
The 2010s saw a considerable increase in numbers of women taking up rock musicianship. Accordingly, there was a profusion of new female or female-fronted bands on the punk scene.

==== Big Joanie ====
Big Joanie is a British punk band formed in London in 2013. Its members are Stephanie Phillips (guitar and vocals) and Estella Adeyeri (bass guitar and vocals), previously also with Chardine Taylor-Stone (drums and vocals). After a few singles and EPs they released their first album in 2018 with Thurston Moore and Eva Prinz's Daydream Library Series, and have since signed to Kill Rock Stars in the U.S.

==== Otoboke Beaver ====
All female punk rock band from Kyoto, Japan. Current members: singer Accorinrin, guitarist Yoyoyoshie, bassist Hiro-chan, and drummer Kahokiss. The band formed in 2009; their most recent release was in May 2022.

==== Pussy Riot ====
Formed in 2011 in Moscow, Russia, as a punk band, artist collective and activist group. In addition to their music, the group used public guerrilla performance to convey political messages. These performances were the basis for music videos available online.

==== Amanda X ====
Post-punk power pop all-female trio from Philadelphia. Billboard magazine called them "leaders in their scene" and has described their harmonies as thrash power-pop. The band is composed of Melissa Brain on drums, Kat Bean on bass and Cat Park on guitar. Their sound has been compared to Sleater Kinney.

==== Meredith Graves ====
Graves is the American frontwoman for the punk rock band Perfect Pussy, which was founded in 2012 in Syracuse, New York. In 2015, Graves went on to found the music label Honor Press, as a feminist gesture to "fight punk's patriarchy". She told New York magazine that her positive experiences making music moved her to establish Honor Press and cited women visual artists Jenny Holzer and Barbara Kruger, as well as writers Kathy Acker and Susan Sontag as inspirations.

==== The Tuts ====
English DIY pop punk band from Hayes, London. Received coverage from alternative music radio, most notably Amazing Radio, and music websites. They were featured in the ITV series Young, British and Muslim in April 2018. The band's former frontwoman Nadia Javed is now a solo artist.

==== Louise Distras ====
English singer, songwriter and musician from Wakefield, West Yorkshire. Named by Kerrang as a 'Star of 2017,', has performed with Buzzcocks, Television, Dropkick Murphys and Billy Bragg.

==== The SoapGirls ====
UK-based, French-born, South African-raised sisters Noemie Debray (guitar, vocals) and Camille Debray (guitar, vocals). Three albums released as punk band. Previous career as dance-pop act on Universal Records in South Africa, scored number one album and four Top 5 singles on country's music charts.

==== Lauren Tate ====
Solo artist and since 2015 lead singer of Hands Off Gretel, an alternative rock/grunge band affiliated to the UK punk scene, formed 2015 in South Yorkshire. Also performs RnB/Hip Hop under the alias Delilah Bon.

==== Maid of Ace ====
Punk rock band consisting of Hastings sisters Alison Cara Elliott (lead vocals/guitar), Anna Coral Elliott (vocals/guitar), Amy Catherine Elliott (bass/vocals) and Abby Charlotte Elliott (drums). Three albums released, footage of their 2015 Glastonbury Festival uploaded by the BBC to its website. Have played at Wembley Stadium, second on the bill to Green Day.

==== Fiona "Fi" Friel ====
Lead singer since late 2000s of dragSTER; her vocals have been described as melodic screaming. She also performs as a vocalist with Conflict.

==== Nina Courson ====
French born, London-based lead singer of punk rock/grunge band Healthy Junkies since 2009. They have released five albums.

==== Puss Johnson ====
Frontwoman since 2002 of band Pussycat and the Dirty Johnsons. They have released four albums. Collaborated with members of 1970s punk band Satan's Rats in 2022, as "Satan's Cats".

==== The Featherz ====
Welsh/English band with glam and punk influences (self-styled as "Flock Rock") led by Danie Centric (known as Danie Cox prior to January 2018, born 15 December 1990 in Bridgend, Wales) on lead vocals and guitar. Cox formed the band with two fellow former members of Georgie Girl And Her Poussez Posse, a band fronted by Georgina Baillie and mentored by Adam Ant. Centric also leads all female Slade tribute band Slady and records with the Lurkers.

==== Petrol Girls ====
English punk rock band formed in London in 2012 by Ren Aldridge and Liepa Kuraitė, with Joe York and Zock Astpai joining later. The band is named after the historical Pétroleuses and is outspokenly feminist.

==== The Kut ====
London-based alternative rock project, assembled by frontwoman and self-taught multi-instrumentalist Princess Maha. Debut album Valley of Thorns reached No. 18 in the UK Independent Albums Chart

==== Barb Wire Dolls ====
Grunge/punk rock band from Greece, based in the United States. They were championed by Lemmy, on whose personal record label (a subsidiary of Warner Music Group) their third and fourth albums were released.

==== Nova Twins ====
English rock duo formed in London, England, in 2014, consisting of vocalist/guitarist Amy Love and bassist Georgia South. Nominated for British Group and Best Rock/Alternative Act at the 2023 Brit Awards.

==== The Ethical Debating Society ====
Three-piece DIY punk, post-riot grrrl group from London. Described by Gigslutz as "one of the most exciting DIY bands" in the UK. Have received coverage from Everett True in The Guardian, Louder Than War and the Hackney Citizen.

==== Priests ====
Post-punk band from Washington, D.C., formed in 2012 by Katie Alice Greer (vocals), Daniele Daniele (drums), Taylor Mulitz (bass), and G.L. Jaguar (guitar). Debut LP Nothing Feels Natural on several Best Albums Of 2017 lists including Billboard, NPR, The Atlantic, and Pitchfork. Rolling Stone described the band as "forging jagged incantations that challenge norms ranging from the driving forces of capitalism to punk's own chest-beating macho traditions."

==== White Lung ====
Canadian punk band consisting of Mish Barber-Way (vocals), Kenneth William (guitars) and Anne-Marie Vassiliou (drums).

==== Doll Skin ====
All-female rock band from Phoenix, Arizona, consisting of Meghan Herring (drums/vocals), Sydney Dolezal (lead vocals/rhythm guitar), Nicole Rich (bass), and Alex Snowden (lead guitar) who all met at School Of Rock Scottsdale.

==== Other 2010s artists ====
Other prominent female or female-fronted acts on the 2010s punk scene included IDestroy, the Bolokos, Cryptic Street, Good Throb, Nekra, and Frau.

== 2020s artists ==
Female or female-fronted acts emerging on the 2020s punk scene include G.L.O.S.S., War on Women, Amy Taylor (Amyl and the Sniffers).

== See also ==
- Women in the early East L. A. punk scene
- Lost Women of Punk Music
- List of all-female bands
- Women in music
