= French punk =

Music genre or scene

French punk is punk rock from France. Punk rock developed in France in the mid-1970s, strongly influenced by the scenes in the United States and United Kingdom, but also influencing the latter. The first European Punk Rock Festival took place at Mont-de-Marsan in France in August 1976.

== History ==
=== The 1970s ===
By the early 1970s, Les punks, a Parisian subculture of Lou Reed fans, had already become well established. Initially, two central figures were Marc Zermati, who had founded Skydog Records in Paris in 1972, owned the Open Market record shop, and promoted American and British bands in France; and Michel Esteban, the owner of the Harry Cover rock merchandise shop and founder of Rock News magazine, who had associated with leading punk and new wave musicians in New York City. The first European Punk Rock Festival, organised by Zermati, took place at Mont-de-Marsan on 21 August 1976, and featured French bands Bijou, Il Biaritz and Shakin’ Street, as well as The Damned.

Zermati later said: "The real punk movement started in New York, and Paris came before the UK because we were really connected to New York... it was exciting because we thought we were conspiring against the establishment." He also claimed that he persuaded Malcolm McLaren to call the movement "punk" rather than McLaren's preferred term, "new wave". An important influence on the style and content of the movement in the UK was the French Situationist movement, led by Guy Debord.

Formed in 1976, Métal Urbain and Stinky Toys were two of the first French punk bands, although at the time most French punk fans preferred English or American punk. Generally regarded as the most original of the early French punk bands, Métal Urbain gave their first performance in December 1976. In August 1977, Asphalt Jungle played at the second Mont-de-Marsan punk festival. Stinky Toys' debut single, "Boozy Creed", came out in September 1977 and was perhaps the first non-English-language punk rock record. The following month, Métal Urbain's first 45, "Panik", appeared. After the release of their minimalist punk debut, "Rien à dire", Marie et les Garçons became involved in New York's mutant disco scene, encouraged by Esteban at ZE Records. Asphalt Jungle's "Deconnection" (feat. Best Magazine critic Patrick Eudeline on vocals), Gasoline's "Killer Man", and Factory's "Flesh" also came out before the end of 1977, and other French punk acts such as Oberkampf and Starshooter soon formed. Other French groups formed, such as Abject and Dentist in Nice, Strychnine in Bordeaux, Starshooter in Lyon. In London, French all-girl group The Lou's were part of the scene, as well as Private Vices, who featured three French members out of four, including Bruno Blum, who at the time wrote for influential French rock magazine Best. Most of these early groups, including Les Olivensteins and The Dogs, can be heard on the 1984 Les Plus Grands Succès du Punk (Skydog) double CD anthology.

=== The 1980s and later ===
More and more punk rock groups appeared in France during the 1980s, such as Ludwig von 88 and Bérurier Noir. These bands are two of the most famous punk rock groups in France.

Another notable act of the decade was Karnage, a post-punk group from Clermont-Ferrand formed in 1981. Regarded as one of the pioneers of French anarcho-punk, Karnage was among the first bands to weave quotations from anarchist thinkers such as Pyotr Kropotkin into their songs. Employing both a live drummer and a drum machine at different points, the band recorded its first four-track demo, Planète Poubelle, in 1982, followed in 1984 by its sole vinyl release, the Total Terminus EP.

Les Wampas appeared during the 1980s but had more success in the 2000s.

During the 1990s Noir Désir became one of the most famous bands in French rock. Their style is a mix between punk rock and grunge. The band Mano Negra also had worldwide success.

During the 2000s there became more and more hardcore punk groups, like Guerilla Poubelle or Tagada Jones. The most successful group from the 2000s is Les Wampas with the songs Manu Chao and Chirac en Prison.

== French Punk Bands ==
=== In the 1970s ===
- Asphalt Jungle
- Edith Nylon
- Fatsy Wataire
- Les Olivensteins
- Marie et les Garçons
- Métal Urbain
- Starshooter
- Stinky Toys
- Dentist
- Private Vices
- Extrabelle

=== In the 1980s ===
- Les Garçons Bouchers
- Lucrate Milk
- Ludwig von 88
- Gogol Premier
- Noir Désir
- Oberkampf
- OTH
- Les Sheriffs
- La Souris Déglinguée
- Les Thugs
- Les Wampas
- Tulaviok
- Parabellum
- Bérurier Noir
- Camera Silens

=== In the 1990s ===
- La Ruda Salska
- Les Sales Majestés
- Les Vieilles Salopes
- Tagada Jones
- Zabriskie Point

=== In the 2000s ===
- The Decline!
- Uncommonmenfrommars
- Nina'School
- Cartouche
- Justin(e)
- Guerilla Poubelle
- Charly Fiasco
- Paris Violence
- Wank For Peace
- Maladroit
- Dirty Fonzy
- Goat Cheese
- Dissidence Radio
- Topsy Turvy's
- The Helltons
- Mind The Gap
- Serie Z

=== In the 2010s ===
- Hightower
- Intenable
- Lion's Law
- Poésie Zéro
