= Nekra (band) =

Punk band

- Origin: London, England
- Genres: Punk rock, hardcore punk
- Years active: 2016–present
- Label: La Vida Es Un Mus
- Members: Spooky Ruño; Kai Stone; Alexandra Graves; Paula Darias
- Website: https://nekra.bandcamp.com

Nekra is a hardcore punk band from London, England formed in 2016. It consists of Spooky Ruño (vocals), Kai Stone (bass), Alexandra Graves (guitar), and Paula Darias (drums). They opened the first Decolonise Fest at DIY Space for London in 2017 and have two releases out on cult label La Vida Es Un Mus. Members of the band have also played in Child's Pose, Turbo, Efialtis, and Frau.

Spooky Ruño and Kai Stone were some of several guest vocalists to contribute to Raise Your Voice Joyce: Contemporary Shouts From Contemporary Voices, a compilation of music covertly recorded by the Canadian band Fucked Up in 2018.

== Discography ==
- Demo - La Vida Es Un Mus (2017)
- Royal Disruptor - La Vida Es Un Mus (2020)

== See also ==
- Women in punk rock
