= Camera Silens =

French punk band

Camera Silens was a French punk band from Bordeaux active between 1981 and 1988.

Their singer and bassist, Gilles Bertin took part in a bank robbery in Toulouse on 27 April 1988, where nearly 12 million francs were stolen. Gilles Bertin went on the run for 28 years before handing himself in to police.

== Biography ==
=== Beginnings (1980–1982) ===
In the summer of 1980, Gilles Bertin and Benoît Destriau met at Philippe's apartment, on a small street near Place Saint-Projet in Bordeaux. At the time, the Saint-Pierre district was still the Bordeaux equivalent of the Fontaine des Innocents in Paris, a meeting place for the "zone" (poor and marginalised population) in a neighbourhood that had not yet completed its gentrification. The group consisted of former high school students in rebellion (from Lycée Camille-Jullian), whose headquarters was the café Le Chiquito. These young punks and skinheads were influenced by the British music scene, whether it was the punk wave (Stiff Little Fingers, UK Subs, Cockney Rejects, The Damned, Angelic Upstarts, Sham 69, Dead Boys) or reggae and ska. They also travelled regularly to England to attend concerts and experience the punk and skinhead scene first-hand.

The group chose a strong name. Camera Silens refers to the isolation cells used for the incarceration of members of the Red Army Faction. For the generation after the 1979 oil shock, too young to have participated in the events of May 1968, rebellion was embodied by the most radical movements of the moment, such as the RAF, the highly militarised IRA (Irish Republican Army), or the famous Red Brigades. It is worth noting that the historical and geographical proximity to the Spanish border also inspired a certain fascination with the ETA-military, which was fighting intensely in post-Franco Basque Country, with the echo of its bombs regularly reaching Bordeaux.

The trio won the Rockotone competition in 1982 during the first edition of Boulevard du Rock at the Grand Parc community hall (a municipal hall in northern Bordeaux that hosted numerous events and bands as diverse as The Clash, and later The Pogues and Bérurier Noir). That night, the prize was jointly awarded with another emerging group, Noirs Désirs (still plural at the time), whose members declined the reward, which consisted of a recording. Camera Silens ultimately benefited and recorded a demo at Deltour Studio in Toulouse. Pour la Gloire one of their earliest tracks was already an anthem. Moreover, Patrice Blanc-Francard, producer of the TV show Les Enfants du Rock on Antenne 2, selected them to represent the punk-oi! movement in a special episode dedicated to Bordeaux.

However, the group lived in precarious conditions, accumulating problems in their daily struggle marked by squats and drugs: moving rehearsal spaces due to unpaid rent, odd jobs to try to buy some equipment, and attempted thefts, including stealing a sound system that led to a criminal conviction and prison time for Gilles. Nonetheless, Camera Silens became the core of the Bordeaux punk scene alongside Brigades (not to be confused with the Parisian group), and Parfum de Femme and Strychnine

Their concerts were still rare, but the group's notoriety spread quickly. The band began structuring its approach with the arrival of Didier as roadie, benefactor, and manager. Fresh from the competition, Camera Silens delivered a loud performance in Sauveterre-de-Guyenne, where a particularly excited horde of punks showed up. The group's reputation was also due to a band of restless punks and skinheads who followed them everywhere, like the Bromley Contingent of the Sex Pistols or Sham Army of Sham 69. This energetic and recurring audience even followed the band outside their department, sometimes giving them the unpleasant feeling of "always playing in Bordeaux." The group's uncompromising violent image, present on leather jackets and city walls, sometimes worked against them, notably in 1986, when they tried to approach a second phase by incorporating rhythm and blues and reggae into their music.

=== Emergence (1983–1984) ===
1983 was a pivotal year at every level: a year of affirmation, but also of doubt and initial upheavals. The Irish band The Outcasts toured France with Camera Silens as their opening act. Pour la gloire appeared on the first volume of the compilation Chaos en France and Réalité on a British cassette. In May 1983, Philippe announced his departure, a heavy blow that jeopardized the band's future. This growing crisis was compounded by escalating drug problems around the group, and financial difficulties further worsened the situation. In the fall, while preparing for a crucial return, Gilles was incarcerated for theft. Benoît, the last member of the original core, seriously doubted and considered ending the adventure, despite the arrival of Éric on bass (ex-Eject, from the already active Montpellier scene) and a new manager, Jean-Marc Gouaux.

A highly anticipated concert was scheduled for 26 October in Eysines as part of Boulevard du Rock: Camera Silens was to share the stage with Oberkampf and Les Coronados, then the spearheads of the French alternative scene. Hours before the event, Benoît still hesitated to go on stage with a still-imperfect lineup (Nicolas handled drums for this concert) and especially without Gilles, but he successfully took the plunge. The audience, aware of the turbulence facing the band, responded warmly to this act of courage, and the second edition of Boulevard du Rock enjoyed one of its best nights. Camera Silens now counted on both the regional and national scene.

In 1984, strengthened by these successes, Camera consolidated its position on the French scene by multiplying concerts and participating in compilations. In May, Gilles being out of prison, the band now performed as a quartet with Benoît, Éric better integrated, and a new drummer, Bruno, ex-Brigades. Gilles focused solely on vocals. Camera rode the wave of oi! and street punk, particularly vibrant in Brest and Le Havre. Concerts followed one another with groups like Reich Orgasm, Single Track, Bootboys, Snix, Decibelios, Conflict, Brutal Combat, and Collabos. They also played with London Cowboys and twice with La Souris Déglinguée, their favorite French band. Media coverage, especially in enthusiastic fanzines, increased their exposure.

The Chaos Festival, held on 20 October in Orléans, was marked that year by clashes between skinheads and security. Bordeaux fans once again attended in large numbers. This festival, rather traumatic due to its excesses, highlighted the widening gap between a skinhead scene that seemed out of control and leaning strongly to the right, and the punk scene.

Their track Semaine Rouge, another early piece, appeared on Chaos en France vol. 2 in June 1984. As the song's authors, Camera Silens believed they could claim their rights and produce a first album with the support of Chaos Productions. Recording began in August 1984 at Studio du Manoir in Léon, recording ten songs on a 24-track recorder. The project did not go as planned. Professionalism was costly, especially since the quartet aimed for the best and wanted to register their compositions with SACEM. These demands were hard for Chaos to accommodate, especially regarding other artists who would have requested the same treatment, and the label suspended its collaboration. Time passed, and the record was still not released. The solution then was to co-produce the album with Studio du Manoir. Unable to invest money, Camera Silens directly contacted New Rose. Meeting Patrick Mathé of New Rose, an emblematic figure of independent rock, was decisive: he agreed to advance the funds for pressing 3,000 copies and handle distribution.
