= Woolf (band) =

Punk band

- Origin: London, England
- Genres: Punk, Queercore, Hardcore
- Years active: 2009–present
- Label: La Vida Es Un Mus
- Members: Colette Rosa; Irene Revell; Sop; G
- Website: https://woolf.bandcamp.com/

Woolf is a British queercore band from London, England. They formed in 2009 at Lambeth Women's Project, and have released two LP records on Hackney punk label La Vida Es Un Mus.

Their first gig was at The Windmill, Brixton with fellow Londoners Trash Kit.

Specially commissioned music written and recorded by the band was included in London based artist Oreet Ashery's audiovisual work Party for Freedom which premiered in October 2012 as part of that year's Liverpool Biennial festival, and was later shown in London, Copenhagen, and Helsinki. The band performed live at the Helsinki screening held at the Photographic Gallery Hippolyte in October 2013. The work was released on DVD by Performance Matters in 2014.

In October 2014 they performed at London's Hayward Gallery as part of Pil and Galia Kollectiv's installation Concrete Gown for Immaterial Flows, part of the exhibition MIRRORCITY.

They played the Static Shock Records Weekender in both 2012 and 2017. Members of the band have also played in Corey Orbison, Roseanne Barrr, Frau, Score, Dregs, Dead Name, and Child’s Pose.

== Discography ==
=== LPs ===
- The Right Way To Play - La Vida Es Un Mus (2012)
- Posing/Improving - La Vida Es Un Mus (2016)

=== Cassettes ===
- Woolf - Self released (2010)

=== Split releases ===
- Split with Trash Kit - Mïlk Records (2011)
