= Gogol Premier =

French singer

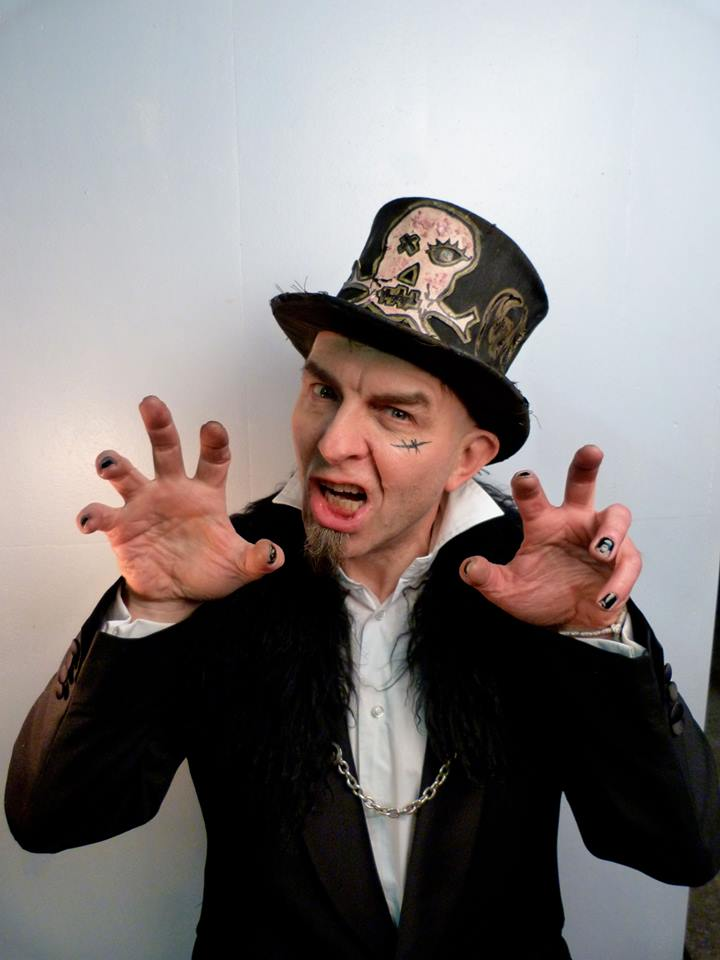

Background information
- Born: August 10, 1957 (age 68)
- Origin: Paris, France
- Genres: Alternative rock, punk rock,
- Years active: 1982–today
- Website: gogolpremier.com

Jacques Dezandre (born 10 August 1957, in Paris), better known by his stage name Gogol Premier, is a French punk rock singer.

In the early 1980s, Gogol and his band "La Horde" first founded a punk group combining music and happenings, which propelled him into the premises of Hara Kiri under the eye of Professor Choron.

Later, the group was promoting alternative rock that advocated independence and self-production, giving more than 300 concerts throughout France and abroad. Gogol Premier produced a prolific amount of music accumulating larger sales of more than a dozen albums.

== Group Influence ==
Gogol got noticed because of provocative lyrics such as "J’encule". His preferred themes are religion, like on his song "If God was not a Serious Topic"; and politics, like on songs such as "May 88". Gogol intends his concerts to be "anarcho-mystical happenings" where the public is invited to make any fantasies onstage between joy and madness become real.

== Career ==
Gogol Premier, often called the Master or Papunk, performs on stage with different groups:

- "La Horde" from 1982, it includes Patrice Diaw (a.k.a. Crawa) with the guitar, and Catherine Machete
- Les Électrodes from 1984 with Martial on the drum (replaced during a tour by Cambouis; the actual drummer of La Souris Déglinguée), Jean-Paul Corréa with the guitar and Gangster with the drum.

The group which preceded Gogol Premier and the Horde was called 15/95. There is one single which came out in 1981 under the following label: Tumulte, autoproduction of 1,000 print where Gogol premier is a drummer. The cover is drawn in black and white.

The first single of "La Horde" was released in November 1982 at New Rose (Patrick Mathé and Laurent Thévenon). The group was composed by Gogol premier (Jacques Dezandre), Patrice Diaw, Denis Diaw and Richard Alexandre; the management was done by Anne-Marie Monville. The personal assistant from Gogol premier is Alain Couvé, from 1982 to January 1984.

On 19 December 2004, Gogol is on stage, giving a concert at "La Loco" in Paris. Since then, Gogol Premier is regularly showing up, with new musicians, including Michaël Zurita from Satan Jokers.

On 1 February 2007, Gogol write an open letter to Ségolène Royal.

In 2014, Gogol Premier plays at L'Olympia his last album, Kabaret Punk.

== Discography ==
=== Summary ===
Gogol Premier Discography
| Title | Year | More Information |
|---|---|---|
| Vite avant la saisie | 1982 | This album had a first printing of 10,000 copies on the label New Rose. In 1983, the CD is Reprinted adding "discouraged to sensitive peoples" on the cover. |
| Ce que je veux faire quand je serai grand | 1983 | Accord/Musidisc. Also released a single with the song (1st album) and "La Bombe" |
| Hencor'pir | 1983 | Includes titles used on the soundtrack of the film Tchao Pantin. |
| Les affres de l'angoisse | 1984 | Avec les Mau-Maus |
| Les femmes de 40 ans / Bambula rock | 1984 | Single |
| Hencor'pir - Vite avant la saisie | 1984 | Version CD des deux premiers albums. |
| Fais pas le mâle Johnny / Interview (par Patrick Eudeline) | 1985 | Single |
| Travail, famille, patrie / La passion inhumaine de St Gol | 1986 | Single Accord/Musidisc. |
| Le retour de la Horde | 1986 | The song Mais qui va nous faire marrer is dedicated to Coluche. |
| Voila des paroles faciles à comprendre / Je bois et je suis le roi | 1986 | Single Accord/Musidisc. |
| Pénétrez | 1986 | |
| La Suisse à genoux | 1987 | Double live Album |
| Ma vie est triste à mourir / Cent millions d'amis | 1987 | Single Musidisc without Pocket CD |
| Poète, prophète, barbare | 1987 | |
| Ennemi public N°1 | 1989 | |
| Et si Dieu n'était pas un sujet sérieux / Croix des bois, crâne de fer, ah ! si tu tues, tu iras en enfer | 1990 | Accord/Musidisc. Many single of this album were played on the radio, which allows the group to broaden its audience beyond the alternative scene. |
| Les Années Kaos | 1990 | |
| Sous les pavés... Le feu | 1992 | |
| Apocalypse | 1996 | |
| La planète des dingues | 1996 | |
| Électrochoc | 2000 | |
| Point G | 2001 | Live. |
| Cyber G1 | 2003 | |
| Gogol Premier fracasse la Tannerie | 2004 | Live. |
| Piraté ! | 2004 | Live à L'Ouvre-boîte, Beauvais, recorded on 13 December 2003. |
| Chansons dangereuses | 2005 | CD + DVD |
| Dernière Croisade | 2008 | Tour recorded on a live album and a DVD-vidéo. |
| Kabaret Punk | 2012 | |

== Public appearing ==
Gogol Premier and "La Horde" appear in the film Tchao Pantin directed by Claude Berri (you can also see Les Porte Mentaux in this film). Gogol plays his own role at the Gibus. The songs in the film came out on the album Hencor'Pir'.

Gogol Premier appeared in the talk show of Christophe Dechavanne Ciel mon mardi with Bérurier Noir and Les Garcons bouchers, in the program Ca se discute of Jean-Luc Delarue, as he was running for presidential elections and also appears on the Web-Tv alternative Addict-Tv where he presents his own show.
