= Guerilla Poubelle =

French rock band

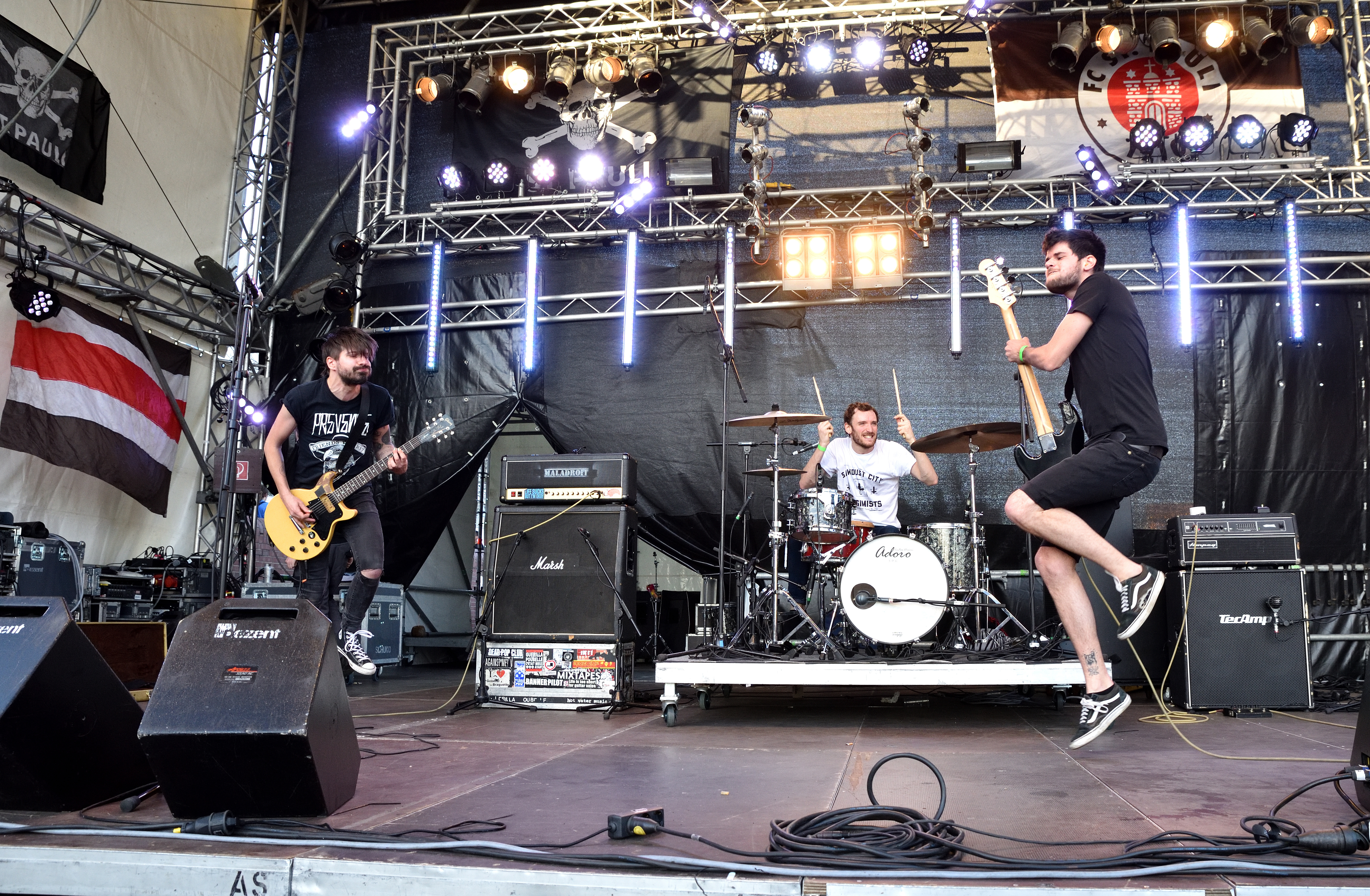

Background information
- Origin: Paris, France
- Genres: Punk rock
- Years active: 2003–
- Labels: Crash Disques, Red Scare Industries
- Members: Till Lemoine; Paul Pechenart; Anthony Sanchis
- Past members: Koj; Cham; Axel; Jokoko; Ken; Alex; Jamie
- Website: http://gxp.guerilla-asso.com/

Guerilla Poubelle is a French punk band formed in 2003. The name translates to 'Dustbin (Garbage Can) Guerrilla' in English.

Their lyrics are based on anarchist and existentialist beliefs and the band are DIY enthusiasts, lead singer and guitarist Till being behind the record label and concert promoter Guerilla Asso founded in 2004.

== History ==
The band formed as a four-piece, following the break of the ska-punk band Les Betteraves. The band originally incorporated a painter who painted and provided backing vocals during shows.

Their debut album entitled Il faut repeindre le monde… en noir (The world must be repainted… in black) was released in 2005.

Following some line-up changes, the band became a three-piece.

They have released numerous splits and EPs, as well as four albums, releasing music on their own Guerilla Asso, Asian Man Records and Crash Disques.

In the summer of 2006, they released a split album with Coquettish, which was followed by a major Japanese tour. The band has toured widely (France, Europe, Japan, Canada, USA) and played over 1 000 live shows.

Guerilla Poubelle has consistently refused to register with the French royalties collection society SACEM, in line with their values, despite selling a significant number of records for an independent band.

== Musical style and influences ==
The band have remained consistent over the years in playing mostly fast, short punk rock songs sung in French, with Till Lemoine's vocal delivery urgent and gritty.

== Members ==
- Till : guitar and vocals
- Antho : bass
- Paul : drums

== Past members ==
- Chamoule: Drums
- Jokoko: painter
- Ken: bass and vocals
- Axel: drums
- Alex: drums
- Kojack: bass
- Jamie: bass

== Sexual assault allegations against Till. ==
In May 2021, an investigation by Mediapart, conducted in partnership with the #MusicToo collective, reported allegations of abuse, harassment, and sexual violence against the singer and guitarist of Guerilla Poubelle, Till Lemoine. Three of his former partners accuse him of having exerted a toxic influence over them, as well as committing “assaults, humiliations, and dominating behaviors towards them”, and of having non-consensual, unprotected intercourse between 2006 and 2008. In the same investigation, Till defends himself against these accusations.

== Quotes ==
"(We) do not want our music consumed like yogurt. I want people to be open-minded [...] and not to swallow every word I pronounce... Too many in the French punk scene act this way and for me they are just slaves." — Till

"When you tell people to recycle, they tell you "oh thats great, how good of you!" It's not great or nice, it should be fucking normal."- Till

== Discography ==
=== Demo ===
- Dégoût et des couleurs (2003)

=== Shared releases ===
- Discographies 2000-20'4 (split album release with Butter Beans) (2005)
- Ninjas & guerilleros (split album release with Coquettish (band)) (2006)
- Petit hommage entre amis (split album release with Justin(e) and Dolores Riposte, tribute to Zabriskie Point (2007)

=== Albums ===
- Il faut repeindre le monde... en noir (2005)
- Punk = Existentialisme (2007)
- GUERILLA POUBELLE + CHARLY FIASCO (2009)
- Amor Fati (2013)
- La nausée (2017)
- L'ennui (2020)
