= Gilles Bertin =

French musician and singer (1961–2019)

- Born: 25 March 1961; Paris, France
- Died: 7 November 2019 (aged 58); Barcelona, Spain
- Occupations: Musician; Singer

Gilles Bertin (25 March 1961 – 7 November 2019) was a French musician and singer, and a member of the punk band Camera Silens from 1981 to 1986.

== Biography ==
Born in Paris on 25 March 1961, Bertin moved to Bordeaux with his parents as a teenager. In Bordeaux, he founded the punk band Camera Silens as a bassist and a singer. The band enjoyed significant success in the French punk rock scene. After he became a drug addict and tested HIV positive, he fell into delinquency.

On 27 April 1988, Bertin participated in a robbery on the Toulouse department of Brink's along with a dozen other robbers, after two years of preparation. The group stole 11,571,316 francs, despite never firing a shot. To this day, most of the loot has never been found. After police launched "Operation Sangria", all participants of the robbery were arrested within two years, except for Bertin. He fled to Spain, and then later, Portugal while running a record shop dedicated to alternative rock. In 1995, Bertin fell ill with AIDS, but survived thanks to tritherapy. In 2000, he returned to Barcelona and worked in a bar owned by his family while living under several identities.

On 26 November 2016, Bertin returned to France to face justice. His trial began on 6 June 2018, and he faced 20 years imprisonment. However, Bertin was only sentenced to five years with suspension, after the prosecution cited "good conduct."

In February 2019, Bertin published an autobiography, titled Trente ans de cavale, ma vie de punk with the publisher Éditions Robert Laffont.

On 7 November 2019, Gilles Bertin succumbed to AIDS after spending several weeks in a coma. He was 58.
