= So Long, Stooge =

- French release poster
- Directed by: Claude Berri
- Written by: Alain Page (based on his novel); Claude Berri
- Produced by: Claude Berri; Pierre Grunstein
- Starring: Coluche; Richard Anconina; Agnès Soral
- Cinematography: Bruno Nuytten
- Edited by: Hervé de Luze
- Music by: Charlélie Couture
- Distributed by: AMLF
- Release date: 21 December 1983
- Running time: 100 minutes
- Language: French
- Box office: €32.5 million

So Long, Stooge (French: Tchao Pantin) is a 1983 French crime drama film directed by Claude Berri and based on a novel by Alain Page, starring Coluche, Agnès Soral and Richard Anconina. It tells the story of Lambert, a broken, bitter man who befriends a younger, lost man whom he tries in vain to help, and later seeks to avenge his friend's murder.

A success at the French box-office, the film is best known for being the first dramatic role of Coluche, then one of France's most popular comedians. Coluche won the César Award for Best Actor for his performance.

== Plot ==
Lambert, a middle-aged, forlorn, heavy-drinking man, works the night shift at a gas station in a disadvantaged area of Paris. One night, Youssef Bensoussan, a young man of mixed Jewish-Arab origins who scrapes a living by selling drugs, enters Lambert's shop both to get supplies from an accomplice and to avoid a police patrol. Lambert and Bensoussan hit it off. They later meet regularly at Lambert's gas station. Lambert, who disapproves of Bensoussan's drug usage, tries to act as a father figure for him without much success.

Bensoussan starts a relationship with Lola, a young punk woman. To impress her, he "borrows" the motorcycle of Rachid, the gang leader for whom he sells drugs. As punishment, he gets beat up by Rachid's men.

One night, Bensoussan gets his merchandise stolen. Lambert proposes to help him out financially so he can pay off his debt to Rachid. Bensoussan later comes back crying for help; he is murdered by Rachid's men as Lambert watches powerlessly.

Lambert decides to avenge Bensoussan's death and takes a leave from work to pursue that mission full time. Bauer, the police detective who is investigating the murder, visits Lambert: during their conversation, Bauer mentions that Lambert was once in the police himself.

Lambert asks Lola for help; she is initially reluctant, but later helps him find Mahmoud, one of Bensoussan's murderers. Lambert shoots Mahmoud dead. Lola, while shocked, decides to follow Lambert.

After the attendant who was replacing him at the station is mistaken for him and murdered, Lambert understands that he has been identified as Mahmoud's killer. He ambushes Rachid outside his bar and shoots him dead. Bauer suspects Lambert, but Lola provides Lambert with an alibi.

Lambert breaks into the apartment of Sylvio, Rachid's main drug supplier, and holds him point blank. Sylvio grovels in terror; Lambert decides not to kill him. Lambert gets back home and sleeps with Lola, later telling her his story: when he was in the police, his son developed a drug habit. Lambert then locked him up in their apartment to force his withdrawal; the boy escaped and was later found dead from an overdose.

Lambert and Lola leave his apartment, as they prepare to escape from the city. While waiting for Lola outside the building, Lambert is shot twice. Lola screams, runs towards the dying Lambert, grabs his gun and fires at their unseen assailants.

== Cast ==
- Coluche as Lambert
- Richard Anconina as Youssef Bensoussan
- Agnès Soral as Lola
- Philippe Léotard as Bauer
- Mahmoud Zemmouri as Rachid
- Mohamed Ben Smaïl as Mahmoud
- Albert Dray as Sylvio
- Annie Kerani as Black lady
- Gogol Premier as punk singer

== Production ==
=== Development ===
In 1982, during a train trip, producer Christian Spillmaecker read several novels, including Tchao Pantin, a recently published crime novel by Alain Page. He was thrilled by the story and later lent the book to Claude Berri. Although Berri was not particularly impressed at first, he eventually realized that Lambert could be a fitting role for Coluche. Berri had a long working history with Coluche, whom he had cast in his first film role in Le Pistonné (1970). He later directed him in the comedy hit Le Maître d'école (1981) and produced several of his other vehicles. Berri bought the adaptation rights to the novel and pitched the project to the actor, who initially turned it down as he was reluctant to play such a dark role.

According to Frédérique "Fred" Romano, his girlfriend at the time, Coluche was a complex man who felt insecure when not in control, which contributed to his refusal. Eventually, Coluche changed his mind and half-heartedly accepted the role, as he owed a large tax debt which the salary offered by Berri would allow him to pay off. At the time, the actor was also going through personal problems: his wife Véronique had left him with their two children. Following their divorce, he had developed a drug addiction. Coluche was also reeling from the suicide of his friend Patrick Dewaere, for which he felt responsible. His personal suffering helped him add depth to his portrayal of Lambert. At the time of filming, both he and Romano were still struggling with drug addiction.

For the role of Bensoussan, Berri hesitated for a long time between the comedian Smaïn and Richard Anconina — both of whom were little known to the general public at the time — before ultimately choosing the latter. Lola's portrayal in the film was partially based on Fred Romano. Berri considered casting Romano herself, but she turned down the offer. The role went to Agnès Soral, whom Berri had already directed as a teenager in the 1977 film Un moment d'égarement. These would prove to be the breakthrough roles for both Anconina and Soral.

=== Filming ===
Shooting began in Paris on 9 May 1983 with sets designed by Alexandre Trauner. The film shows poor neighborhoods in Paris, most of which have since been renovated or gentrified. The gas station, which has since disappeared, was located on rue Pajol, a stone's throw from the La Chapelle metro station. It was illuminated with neon, under the suggestion of cinematographer Bruno Nuytten. Scenes were also shot in the Belleville neighborhood.

The film was shot mostly at night in order to achieve a gloomy atmosphere. Shooting was complicated by Coluche's condition which sometimes made it necessary to film him from behind. The actor kept wearing his gas station attendant jacket when not filming. Soral, in order to blend in with her role, adopted the punk lifestyle and lost weight. The actress later said that Coluche and she had become friends on the shoot. According to Soral, the main actors were all undergoing personal problems during filming, which benefited the film by helping achieve the desired tone: besides Coluche, Anconina had just ended a relationship, just like Léotard who had recently separated from Nathalie Baye, and Berri himself was going through a difficult romantic situation.

Anconina later said that the slap Coluche gives him in one scene was entirely real. At first, Coluche was reluctant to hit him hard, so Anconina asked him to go all the way.

The punk concert sequence takes place at the "Gibus" (then called "Le Petit Gibus", described in the film as "a punk bar at République"), a small Parisian concert hall known at the time to be the Parisian CBGB. The group appearing in the movie were a famous punk band from the 1980s, "The Horde", and their singer Gogol Premier.

Shooting in the infamous districts of the north of Paris did not go smoothly, due to the film crew causing inconvenience for the neighborhood's petty drug dealers, but arrangements could ultimately be made.

== Release ==
Claude Berri personally insisted that the film, shot in June 1983, be released in December of the same year in order to be able to compete to the César Awards ceremony in March 1984: he had a premonition that Coluche could win an award.

== Reception ==
=== Box office ===
Released theatrically in France on 21 December 1983, So Long, Stooge started in third place at the box office on the week of its release with more than 433,000 admissions, behind a reissue of Snow White and the Seven Dwarfs and Les Compères. on the following week, the film still remained in the third place, having sold 851,188 admissions since its release, including 417,690 admissions during the second week. On the week of 4 January 1984, the film climbed to second place behind a new release, the crime film Rue Barbare, selling 383,850 tickets, This allowed the film to reach a total of 1,235,038 admissions, and surpass the 2 million mark by the start of February 1984. While it was a modest success in cinemas throughout the month of February, So Long, Stooge climbed back to 9th place following its triumph at the Césars Awards in March 1984, which allowed it to get closer to 2,400,000 admissions. The following week it moved up to third place at the box office with 224,565 admissions, bringing the total to 2,600,970 admissions. The film passed the 3 million admissions mark on the week of 2 April 1984, before leaving the top 30 at the end of that month. The film benefited from a theatrical rerelease during the summer of 1986, following the death of Coluche. This allowed it to return to the weekly top 30 and pass the 3.5 million admissions mark by 25 June 1986, only a few days after the actor's death. At the end of August 1986, the film was still in the top 30 and reached 3.7 million admissions.

Overall, the film was a great commercial success with 3,829,139 admissions, including 856,133 in Paris, ranking 8th at the box-office for the year of its release.

=== Critics ===
So Long, Stooge was well received by critics. Upon release, Jacques Siclier of Le Monde praised Coluche's performance and Berri's evolution as a director, likening the film's style to a return to poetic realism. He noted, however, that the film meandered after Bensoussan's death, as Lola's character assumed too much prominence at the expense of the story. In 2025, 42 years after the film's release, Jacques Morice of Télérama called it a classic and praised Coluche's "unforgettable" performance.

== Awards ==
So Long, Stooge received 12 nominations at the 9th César Awards in 1984, including Best Film and Best Director. It eventually won five awards, most notably the César Award for Best Actor for Coluche. Richard Anconina won two Awards for his performance, Best Supporting Actor and Most Promising Actor. Agnès Soral was also nominated for the Best Supporting Actress and Most Promising Actress Awards, though she won neither. The film also won the Awards for Best Sound and Best Cinematography.

The film was selected as the French entry for the Best Foreign Language Film at the 57th Academy Awards, but was not accepted as a nominee.

Coluche did not take his Award very seriously and did not capitalize on it for his choice of roles. His next films were comedies, which he admittedly did for the money. Coluche's friend Gérard Lanvin later said that Coluche made fun of the fact that "those idiots" had given him a César Award for his performance, whereas in his opinion he had not been acting at all and had just been filmed in his natural depressed state.

== Home media ==
So Long, Stooge was released on DVD and Blu-ray, and on VOD on various streaming services including Pathé, Arte, Canal+ and Amazon Prime. In 2022, it was temporarily made available on Netflix. It was released in the United States and United Kingdom on Blu-ray by Radiance Films on 30 July 2024.

== See also ==
- List of submissions to the 57th Academy Awards for Best Foreign Language Film
- List of French submissions for the Academy Award for Best Foreign Language Film
