= Women in the early East L. A. punk scene =

Women in the early East Los Angeles punk scene were part of a subcultural movement associated with a brand of feminism that combined the ethics and politics of the Chicano movement, second-wave feminism, the LGBT community, and punk rock music during the late 1970s and early 1980s.

== Origins ==
The East L.A. punk scene gained organizational momentum through throwing backyard shows through a lack of a steady club scene in East L.A., and it being near impossible for a band from East L.A. to gain a slot at a club in the Hollywood scene. After a steady network of backyard shows began to appear, places of notoriety within the scene began to appear such as Bird and Cornwell, First and Velasco, Beastie's Pad, Boo-Boo's House, Joe's Pit, Flipper's Pad, and the Dustbowl. A person could get into a show for three dollars or less, and one could see one to eight bands.

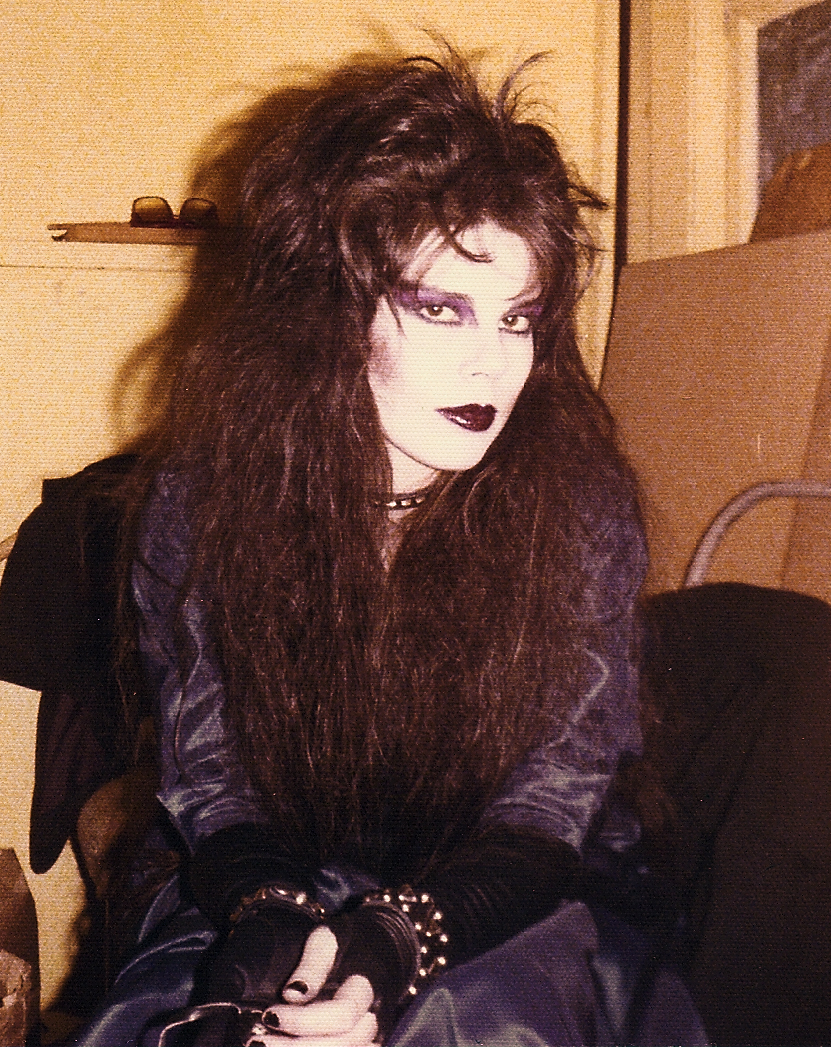
Pat Bag in 1977 or early 1978

== Politics ==
As expressed by Alice Bag of the Bags and Teresa Covarrubias of the Brat in interviews, they turned to the punk scene due to the feeling of their feminist's stances being rejected by the greater Mexican American community as well as their cultural identity being rejected by mainstream western feminism. The number of Chicana women in the East L.A. scene saw growth as the East L.A. punk scene was seen as a way to combine Chicanismo and feminism. Songs performed usually had lyrics that were associated with anarchism, Chicanismo, second wave feminism, gender violence, and racism.

== Performances ==
Performances differed between artist. Alice Bags would dress in a feminine attire, sometimes in a polka dot dress, heels, chola makeup, and performed in an energetic and spastic manner on stage that earned her the name "Violence Girl". Henry Rollins of the band Black Flag has referred to Alice's behavior on stage as "real L.A." Backstage Pass wanted to challenge how women were supposed to act on stage in total disregard to what men wanted women to behave on stage. In interview released by Vice, May 21st, 2018, Marina Del Rey recounts, "Once you commit to not being constrained by male rules, you don't have to fight anymore. You can be sexy or you can be a bitch and you don't have to worry about anyone judging your behavior." Vaginal Davis of the band Cholita! "The Female Menudo" and Nervous Gender used defiant humor and social critique within her performances. "Known for their hybrid performance art concerts, leaned into the social chaos and uncertainty of living in Los Angeles", she used her performances to create a sense of an "aesthetic assault".

== Bands ==
- Backstage Pass
- Castration Squad (Members of the Go-Go's and the Bags)
- Cholita! (The Female Menudo)
- Nervous Gender
- The Bags
- The Brat

== Legacy ==
The legacy of these women can be seen in contemporary bands in the East L.A. punk scene. Much like their predecessors, these newer bands cover topics with their lyrics and performances that are associated with fourth-wave feminism, gender-related violence, and racism. Bands include Downtown Boys, Destruye Y Huye, Futura, Strangers, as well as many others.

== See also ==
- Women in punk rock
