= La Vida Es Un Mus =

Independent record label

- Founded: 1999
- Genre: Punk; Hardcore; Post Punk; Garage Punk
- Country of origin: United Kingdom
- Location: Hackney, London
- Official website: http://lavidaesunmus.com/

La Vida Es Un Mus, also known as La Vida Es Un Mus Discos, is an English independent record label specialising in underground punk founded in the London Borough of Hackney in 1999. It has released records by bands from Great Britain and Europe, North and South America, and Asia.

== Artists on La Vida Es Un Mus ==
- Anxiety
- Arms Race
- The Astronauts
- Belgrado
- The Chisel
- Flesh World
- Glue
- Good Throb
- Haram
- Home Front
- Hygiene
- La Misma
- Limp Wrist
- London Clay
- Los Crudos
- Lumpy and the Dumpers
- Nekra
- No
- Ojo Por Ojo
- Orden Mundial
- Primetime
- Rakta
- Rixe
- Snob
- S.H.I.T.
- The Shitty Limits
- Straw Man Army
- Tube Alloys
- Una Bèstia Incontrolable
- Woolf
