= Home Front (band) =

Canadian band

- Origin: Edmonton, Alberta, Canada
- Genres: Punk rock, post-punk, new wave
- Years active: 2021–present
- Label: La Vida Es Un Mus
- Members: Graeme McKinnon; Clint Frazier; Bendy Straws; Ian Boothman; War Dog

Home Front is a Canadian post-punk band from Edmonton, Alberta formed in 2021, by Graeme McKinnon, formerly of Wednesday Night Heroes, and Clint Frazier of Shout Out Out Out Out respectively. Their sound has been characterized as a blend of both punk and new wave influences into a style reminiscent of Echo and the Bunnymen, Blitz, and The Cure. Noel Gardner of The Quietus described the band as "OMD meets Sham 69".

To date, they have released one studio album, their critically-acclaimed full-length, Games of Power (2023) and two EP's, Think of the Lie (2021) and Nation (2023) via British independent punk label, La Vida Es Un Mus. The former was produced by Jonah Falco of Canadian hardcore band, Fucked Up and mixed and mastered by Frazier's Shout Out Out Out Out' bandmate, Nik Kozub.

Games of Power was longlisted for the 2023 Polaris Music Prize.

On September 9, 2025, they announced their second full-length album, Watch It Die, which released on November 14, 2025. The album was longlisted for the 2026 Polaris Music Prize.

== Band members ==
- Graeme McKinnon – lead vocals, guitar, bass (2021–present)
- Clint Frazier – drums, synths, keyboards (2021–present)
- Bendy Straws – bass, vibes (2022–present)
- Ian Boothman – guitar (2022–present)
- War Dog – drums (2022–present)

== Discography ==
=== Studio albums ===
- Games of Power (2023)
- Watch It Die (2025)

=== EPs ===
- Think of the Lie (2021)
- Nation (2023)
