= Frau (band) =

Punk band

- Origin: London, England
- Genres: Punk, hardcore
- Label: Static Shock
- Members: Ashley Holland; Colette Rosa; Paula Darias; Núria
- Website: https://fraupunk.bandcamp.com/

Frau is an all-female hardcore punk band from London, England. Billboard magazine named them one of "20 All-Female Bands You Need To Know"; rock critic Maria Sherman compares their sound to Bikini Kill. The punkzine Maximumrocknroll describes the band's highly charged and frantic sound as equal to the flippant swagger of Teenage Jesus and the Jerks. Ashley Holland of the band, who also plays with Personnel and Good Throb, states that Frau seldom plays with other hardcore bands because the hardcore punk scene does not take female musicians seriously. In addition to Holland, the other members of the band are Colette Rosa who sings in queercore punk band Woolf, Paula and Núria who also played in the Barcelona band Las Timidas. The band's sound has been noted for the use of intense distortion with powerful, forceful vocals.

== Recordings ==
Their debut EP, Punk is my Boyfriend, was released by Static Shock Records in 2014; and Mira was released in 2015.

== See also ==
- Women in punk rock
