= Good Throb =

Punk band

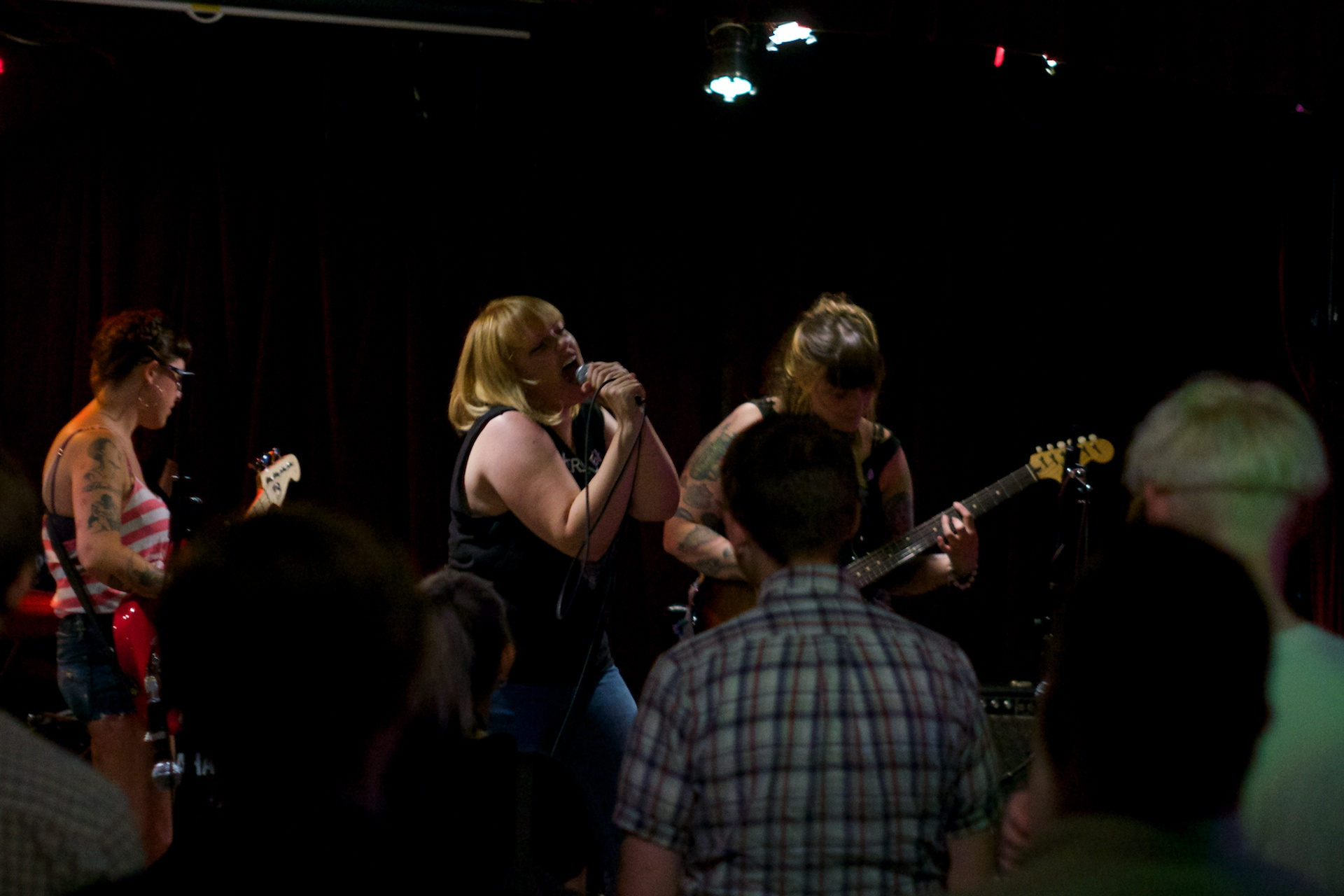
- Good Throb in London in 2013

Background information
- Origin: London, England
- Genres: Punk rock, hardcore punk
- Years active: 2010–2016
- Labels: Super-Fi Records; Muscle Horse; La Vida Es Un Mus
- Past members: KY Ellie (Ellie Roberts); BB Thing (Bryony Beynon); Ash Tray (Ashleigh Holland); L-Hard (Louis Harding)
- Website: https://goodthrob.bandcamp.com/

Good Throb was a feminist punk band from London. They released one album and three 7" vinyl record EPs, all on independent record labels.

== History ==
Good Throb was active between 2010 and 2016. They consisted of KY Ellie (Ellie Roberts) on vocals, BB Thing (Bryony Beynon) on guitar, Ash Tray (Ashleigh Holland) on bass and L-Hard (Louis Harding) on drums. The band formed after having all met through the London punk scene.

They started with the intention of everyone taking part doing something new to them, whether that was playing an instrument or being the vocalist. Beynon and Harding had previously played together in a band called The Sceptres where Beynon was vocalist and Harding was on bass. Holland later sang in the band Frau.

They released three 7-inch EPs and one full-length LP. Music journalist Jenn Pelly described them as "raw, primal, ferocious, pissed, crude" and "a manic London post-punk band that hinges between razorsharp cleverness and total disintegration".

Guitarist Bryony Beynon was one of several guest vocalists to contribute to Raise Your Voice Joyce: Contemporary Shouts From Contemporary Voices, a compilation of music covertly recorded by the Canadian band Fucked Up in 2018.

== Discography ==
=== Albums ===
- Fuck Off - SuperFi Records (UK) / White Denim / Sabermetric (USA) 12-inch LP, MP3 (2014)

=== EPs ===
- S/T - SuperFi Records (UK) 7-inch EP, MP3 (2012) / Play Pinball (USA) 7-inch EP, MP3 (2013)
- Culture Vulture - Muscle Horse (UK) / Accidental Guest (USA) 7-inch EP, MP3 (2013)
- S/T - La Vida Es Un Mus (UK) 7-inch EP, MP3 (2016)

=== Compilations ===
- 9 Modern Classics - Cool Marriage Records (EU) Cassette (2016)
