= Oberkampf (band) =

- Genres: Punk rock
- Years active: 1978–1985
- Website: http://www.oberkampf.net/

Oberkampf were a French punk rock band formed in 1978 by Pat Kebra (guitar), Joe Hell (vocals), Buck-Dali (bass) and Dominik Descoubes (drums).

== Discography ==
=== Albums ===
- P.L.C - 1983
- Cris sans thème - 1985

=== Singles ===
- Couleurs sur Paris - 1981
- Fais attention - 1985
- Maximum - 1983
- La Marseillaise - 1983
- Linda - 1983
