= Edith Nylon =

French rock band

Edith Nylon is a French rock band that was active from the end of the 1970s to the beginning of the 1980s and has had a revival in 2020 after a 40-year hiatus with new live shows and a new album "La Fin de la Vie Sauvage" released in 2021.

Part of the Punk movement, Edith Nylon was a precursor to new wave music. Edith Nylon obtained a certain level of success in its time and even opened for The Police. The singer Mylène Khaski has become a company director in Asia.

== Group members ==
- Mylène Khaski : vocals
- Christophe Boutin : guitars
- Zako Khaski : guitar, bass, background vocals
- Frédéric Noyé : synthesizers, piano, guitar
- Karl Mormet : guitars
- Albert Tauby : drums

== Discography ==
- 1979 : Edith Nylon (CBS)
- 1980 : Quatre essais philosophiques (CBS)
- 1980 : Johnny Johnny (CBS)
- 1982 : Echo bravo (Chiswick)
