= The Power Out =

Studio album by Electrelane
- Released: 26 January 2004
- Recorded: April 2003 – May 2003
- Studios: Electrical Audio, Chicago, Illinois
- Genre: Post-rock
- Length: 43:25
- Languages: English, French, Spanish, German
- Label: Beggars Banquet
- Producer: Steve Albini

Electrelane chronology
Rock It to the Moon (2001)	The Power Out (2004)	Axes (2005)

Singles from The Power Out
- 1. "On Parade" Released: 20 October 2003; 2. "This Deed" Released: 26 April 2004

The Power Out is the second album by English rock group Electrelane. It was released on compact disc and vinyl in 2004 by Too Pure. It was recorded in Chicago, Illinois in early 2003 by Steve Albini. The album's lead single, "On Parade" was a hit on college radio. The album did not receive mainstream commercial success, despite receiving mostly positive critical reviews.

== Background ==
=== Signing with Too Pure ===
The band's first release, Rock It to the Moon received limited commercial response due to limited distribution, promotion, and exposure. The band signed with Too Pure, a member of the Beggars Group, for their follow-up. As drummer Emma Gaze explained, the new label had "so many people and departments, and we knew, purely for that reason, that there would be more response to the new album."

Critics also commented that Too Pure was a good fit for Electrelane, as many of the other label's acts (such as Stereolab and Th' Faith Healers) shared similarities with the group.

=== Production ===
The band brought in producer Steve Albini for The Power Out. Initially, Mia Clarke had contacted him to try to get a spot on the All Tomorrow's Parties (ATP) music festival. The roster had already been filled, but Albini wrote back to the band telling them to contact him if they wanted to work with him in the future. The band went to Steve Albini's Electrical Audio studio in Chicago, Illinois and recorded the album in a break-free three-week period from April to May 2003.

Electrelane still handled production duties, while Albini was in charge of recording and mixing. With Rock It to the Moon using overdubs and Pro Tools mixing, Albini was renowned for frills-free, all-analog recording, generally keeping effects to a minimum; he used these techniques on The Power Out as well.

== Content ==
The Power Out is perhaps best characterised by a "startling and unique" "stylistic hodgepodge". The major stylistic themes of the album, which often overlap, are foreign languages and literary references.

The album opener, "Gone Under Sea" is sung entirely in French. The following song, "On Parade" was inspired by Radclyffe Hall's 1928 lesbian novel, The Well of Loneliness. A large part of the lyrics in "The Valleys" come from Siegfried Sassoon's 1917 poem "A Letter Home" (from The Old Huntsman). The title of the fifth track, "Take The Bit Between Your Teeth," is another reference to The Well of Loneliness. The literary references continue on the sixth track, with "Oh Sombra!" The song's Spanish lyrics are a sonnet by 16th century Catalan poet Juan Boscán Almogáver. Finally, on "This Deed" the German lyrics are from Friedrich Nietzsche's Die fröhliche Wissenschaft followed by the inclamation "Hände hoch!" (or "Hands up!"). The lyrical content reflects a departure from the band's earlier album, which was almost entirely instrumental.

Musically, the album is less diverse than the lyrics, with Electrelane playing within their usual Krautrock-inspired range, although the songs could be considered to be more within conventional pop structures than their predecessors. Perhaps the most notable musical departure from Electrelane's norm is the inclusion of the Chicago a cappella ensemble for "The Valleys", to invoke a 1960s gospel hymn to the song. A saxophone and a piano are used in the two closing tracks.

== Critical reception ==
Professional ratings
Aggregate scores
Source	Rating
Metacritic	78/100
Review scores
Source	Rating
AllMusic	4.5/5 stars
Blender	3/5 stars
Entertainment Weekly	A−
The Guardian	4/5 stars
Los Angeles Times	3.5/4 stars
Mojo	4/5 stars
The Observer	4/5 stars
Pitchfork	7.5/10
Q	4/5 stars
Uncut	4/5 stars

Critical reception to The Power Out was generally very positive. While the band's use of other languages and literary references may have been referred to as gimmicks, they were regarded as gimmicks with merit. The album was more focused than its predecessor, with Emma Warren of The Observer, considering the album to be "a great example of how the band have transformed themselves from a sparky but essentially limited instrumental four-piece into the major league" and The New York Times calling it "impressive".

== Track listing ==
All songs were written by Electrelane, except where noted.

1. "Gone Under Sea" – 3:12
2. "On Parade" – 2:35
3. "The Valleys" (Electrelane, Siegfried Sassoon) – 5:20
4. "Birds" – 3:53
5. "Take the Bit Between Your Teeth" – 4:58
6. "Oh Sombra!" (Electrelane, Juan Boscán Almogáver) – 2:58
7. "Enter Laughing" – 3:42
8. "This Deed" (Electrelane, Friedrich Nietzsche) – 3:24
9. "Love Builds Up" – 5:24
10. "Only One Thing Is Needed" – 4:33
11. "You Make Me Weak at the Knees" – 3:24

Some versions of the album contain the following bonus tracks:

- "I'm on Fire" (Bruce Springsteen) – 2:16
- "Teach the Sailor to Pray" – 3:16

== Personnel ==
- Verity Susman – guitar, keyboards, saxophone, vocals, choir arrangement
- Emma Gaze – drums
- Mia Clarke – guitar
- Rachel Dalley – bass
- Chicago a cappella – vocals
- Steve Albini – engineer
- Steve Rooke – mastering

== Release history ==
Region	Date	Label	Format	Catalog
United Kingdom	26 January 2004	Too Pure	CD	PURE 142CD
United Kingdom	26 January 2004	Too Pure	12" LP	PURE 142LP
United States	3 February 2004	Too Pure, Beggars Banquet	CD	PURE 142
