= Decolonise Fest =

Music festival

- Genre: Punk
- Locations: DIY Space for London (2017 - 2019); Signature Brew, Haggerston (2022 - 2024); Signature Brew Blackhorse Road, Walthamstow (2025)
- Years active: 2017 - present
- Founders: DIY Diaspora Punx Collective
- Website: https://decolonisefest.co.uk/

Decolonise Fest is a British punk music festival. The first music festival created by and for people of colour, its first event was held at DIY Space for London in 2017.

== Background ==
In 2016 a collective named DIY Diaspora Punx was formed. It was assembled by Stephanie Phillips of Big Joanie, inspired by Chicago's Black and Brown Punk Fest. The collective also contained other London musicians such as Ray Aggs.

Over the weekend of 2–4 June 2017 the first Decolonise Fest was held at DIY Space for London with international bands, consisting of live music, workshops and panels.

Panels at the festival have included intergenerational musicians such as Miki Berenyi.

Two more festivals followed in 2018 and 2019, before the COVID-19 pandemic forced the cancellation of the one planned for 2020, and ultimately the closure of DIY Space For London. Two further festivals have happened at Signature Brew in Haggerston in 2022 and 2024.

In 2023 the collective announced a touring version of the festival. The first event was held at Mono in Glasgow on 11 November that year. The lineup was Kapil Seshasayee, R.AGGS (Ray Aggs), and Trishaaa. The second touring event was held at The Castle & Falcon in Birmingham on 30 March 2024. The lineup for that was Blue Ruth, Resting Bitch Face, and Layla Tutt.

== Line-ups ==
Date	Venue	Bands
3-4 October 2026	Signature Brew Blackhorse Road, Walthamstow, London	Frozemode, Miki Berenyi, Third Culture, Hang Linton, Silver Tabby, TM Distant, Sacred Paws, Baby Said, Uninvited, Mashaal, Eatboys., Dygora
6–7 September 2025	Signature Brew Blackhorse Road, Walthamstow, London	Ashaine White, Bona Rays, Dogviolet, Hyphen, Master Peace, Midwich Cuckoos, Native James, steel., The Genes, The None
13–15 September 2024	Signature Brew, Haggerston, London	Lilith Ai, Ritual Error, SPIDER, Anserine, Maya Lakhani, Grunt, Sunday Best, Tripsun, Currls, Decolonise Choir, Restless Taxis, Shoefig, Lip Stain, Dogviolet, Buds., Dead Air
16–18 September 2022	Signature Brew, Haggerston, London	Bishi, Break Fate, Breakup Haircut, Currls, Dystopia, Fraulein, Grove, Gurnal Gadafi, Incaseyouleave, Marigold Spitfire, Miss Jacqui, Passionflower, Ray Aggs, Spirit Sigh, Swaraj Chronos
30–31 May 2020 (cancelled due to the COVID-19 pandemic)	DIY Space for London	Crystal Axis, Special Interest, The Kominas, DeLila Black, Lifeless Past, PRNCSS, Breakup Haircut, Sink Ya Teeth, Spring.Fall.Sea
29–30 June 2019	DIY Space for London	Best Praxis, Big Joanie, Birthgiver, Cecilia, Dubais, Electric Fire, Immigranti, Handle, Screaming Toenail, Th'Sheridans, Weedrat, Whitelands
22–24 June 2018	DIY Space for London	Alpha Maid, Stanfield, Secret Power, Fish Police, Kapil Seshasayee, Great Wight, No Home, Shocks of Mighty, Ms Mohammed, Guttfull, Bob Vylan, Nova Twins
2–4 June 2017	DIY Space for London	Art of Burning Water, Art Trip & The Static Sound, Big Joanie, Carlos Maurizio, Divide and Dissolve, Lilith Ai, Nekra, Ragana, Sabata, Sacred Paws, SBSM, Screaming Toenail, Shabsi Mann, Skinny Girl Diet, The Tuts, Tony Yap, Vodun
