= DIY Space for London =

Former music venue in south London

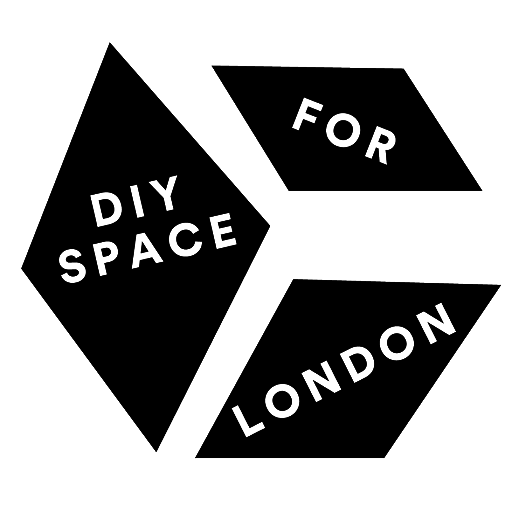

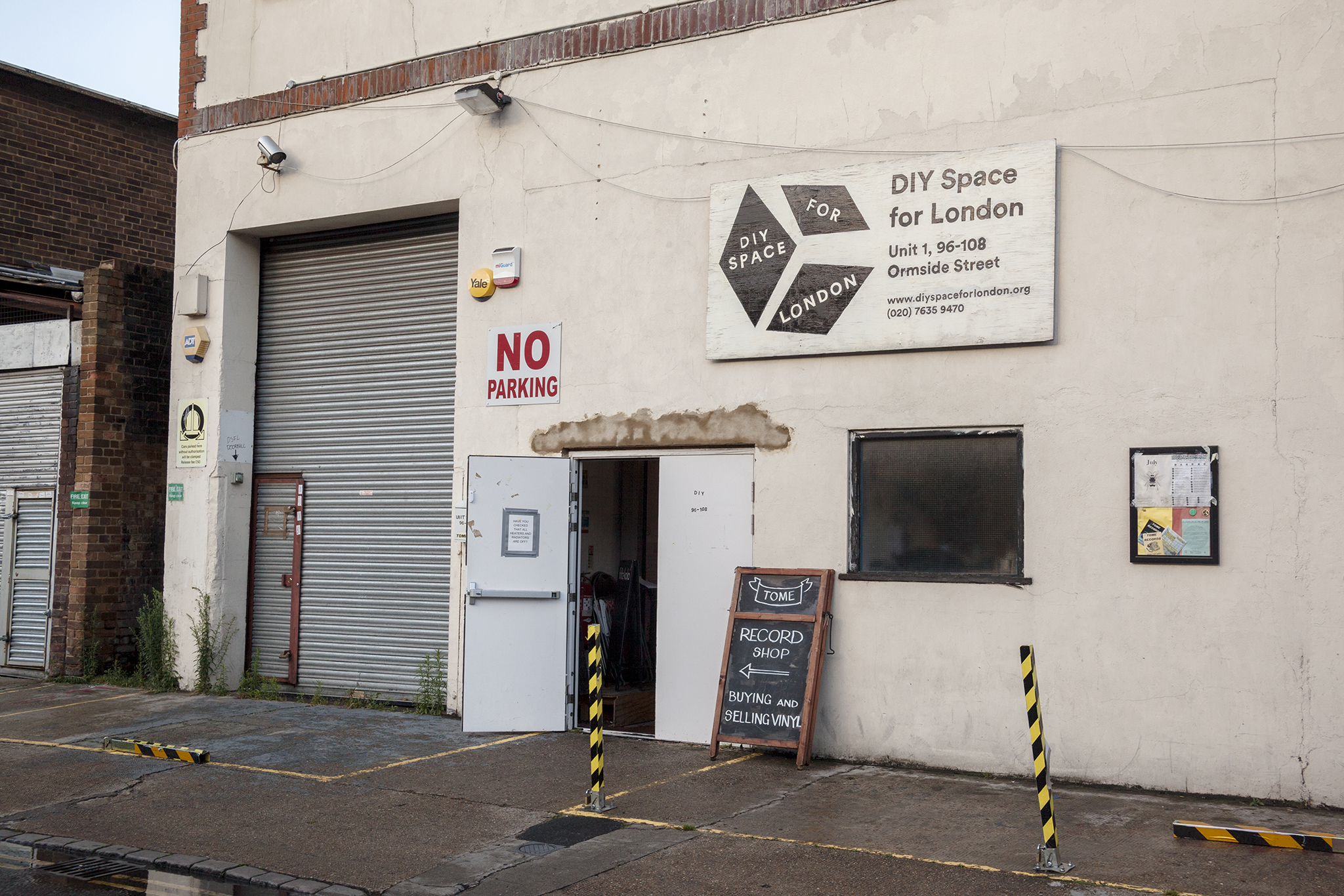
- The front of DIY Space For London on 27 July 2017.
- Interactive map of DIY Space for London
- Location: 96-108 Ormside St, London; SE15 1TF; United Kingdom
- Coordinates: 51.4824°N 0.0555°W
- Capacity: 160
- Events: Punk rock, Hardcore punk, Post-punk, Indie rock, Avant-garde music

Construction
- Opened: September 2015
- Closed: June 2020

Website
- diyspaceforlondon.org

DIY Space for London was a volunteer-run social centre, music venue, rehearsal space, and creative hub formerly located at 96-108 Ormside Street in South Bermondsey, London.

== History ==
The DIY Space for London collective, started in 2012, raised £20,000 through benefit gigs, events, and community grants to secure a five year lease.

The space opened at 96-108 Ormside Street in South Bermondsey in September 2015 as a volunteer-run social centre, music venue, rehearsal space, and creative hub. The founding collective had first struggled for two years to find a suitable location.

Inspired by other social centres such as 1 in 12 Club in Bradford, their goal was to, "create a sustainable, collectively run space to put gigs on, hold meetings and building a communal infrastructure" that would be "run by its members and open for anyone to get involved in." It had ten interlinked volunteer collectives taking care of running the space.

Whether volunteering or attending, the space was both functionally and legally a members' club. As of June 2017 the space had over 5000 members.

The space was a regular venue for punk shows, zine fairs, fundraisers, and what Jessica Wrigglesworth writing for Loud and Quiet called; "anything anti-establishment". The events often sold cheaper tickets for the low-waged and the venue had a ramp installed for access to the stage.

Volunteers of the space hosted a radio show showcasing the type of musicians to appear there on NTS Radio between 2016 and 2017.

From 2016 to 2019 the space was the venue for First Timers, a yearly series of workshops culminating in a two day festival that encourages "new faces and voices in bands", in order to "do something about the lack of diversity in the music community".

Over the weekend of 2-4 June 2017, DIY Diaspora Punx (a collective started by Stephanie Phillips of Big Joanie, and also containing other London musicians such as Ray Aggs) put on the first Decolonise Fest at DIY Space for London. Decolonise Fest is the UK's first music festival created by and for people of colour. The second edition of the festival (again mostly held at DIY Space) occurred from 22 to 24 June 2018, with a third over 29 to 30 June 2019.

After the closure of its original venue Power Lunches in late 2015, the space was also the location for Bent Fest, a yearly queer punk festival held in London between 2015 and 2019.

On 12 June 2020 the collective announced due to temporary closures enforced due to the COVID-19 pandemic they had been unable to renew their lease on their current premises and would be seeking a new location.

== Notable performers ==
Artists that have performed at the venue include:

- Allo Darlin'
- Big Joanie
- Career Suicide
- Colour Me Wednesday
- Crywank
- Doe
- Dowsing
- Downtown Boys
- Dream Nails
- The Ex
- Fightmilk
- Fresh
- GHUM
- Good Throb
- The Goon Sax
- Graf Orlock
- The Intelligence
- Iron Chic
- Jeffrey Lewis
- Joanna Gruesome
- Kero Kero Bonito
- King Krule
- Little Fists
- Martha
- Makthaverskan
- Mammoth Penguins
- Me Rex
- Nana Grizol
- Paint It Black
- Pardon Us
- PAWS
- Petal
- Petrol Girls
- Pity Sex
- Priests
- Quintron
- Radiator Hospital
- Rae Spoon
- Sacred Paws
- Sauna Youth
- Screaming Toenail
- Sheer Mag
- Shh...Diam!
- Shopping
- Skinny Girl Diet
- Sleeping States
- Slingshot Dakota
- The Spook School
- Squid
- Trash Kit
- Total Control
- The Tuts
- Voorhees
- Weddings
- Witching Waves
- Wolf Girl
- Woolf
- Worriers
