= No Shouts, No Calls =

Studio album by Electrelane
- Released: 30 April 2007
- Recorded: Mid 2006 – November 2006
- Studio: Planet Roc (Berlin, Germany); Key Club Recording (Benton Harbor, Michigan)
- Genre: Rock; Post-rock
- Length: 47:26
- Label: Too Pure

Electrelane chronology
Axes (2005)	No Shouts, No Calls (2007)

Singles from No Shouts, No Calls
- 1. "To the East" Released: 12 March 2007; 2. "In Berlin" Released: 26 November 2007

Professional ratings
Review scores
Source	Rating
AllMusic	4/5 stars
The A.V. Club	(B+)
BBC Collective	3.5/5 stars
Drowned in Sound	(9/10)
The Guardian	2/5 stars
NME	(6/10)
Pitchfork Media	(7.8/10)
PopMatters	(8.0/10)
Stylus Magazine	(A−)
Tiny Mix Tapes	3.5/5 stars
Robert Christgau	(1-star Honorable Mention)

No Shouts, No Calls is the fourth album by English rock group Electrelane. It was released on CD and LP in 2007 by Too Pure.

== Background ==
The group began writing material in Berlin's Planet Roc Studio in the summer of 2006, at the height of the World Cup. During that period, the band became fans of the sport, going so far as to rearrange their recording schedules around the event and including a sample of a match between Hertha BSC Berlin and FC Moskva in the song "Five" of their new album.

In September and October, they were at Key Recording in Benton Harbor recording and mixing their album. It is their first to be entirely digitally recorded and mixed. In November, the band announced on their official website that they had finished recording and had titled their album No Shouts, No Calls.

== Release and reception ==
The album was released in on 23 April 2007 in Japan, 3 May 2007 in the US and 30 April 2007 elsewhere. The first single, titled "To the East," was released on 12 March 2007. The album received generally positive reviews, with Heather Phares of AllMusic calling some songs "among the band's finest work"; detractors included Leonie Cooper of The Guardian, who mentioned the band had a "penchant for turning every tune [into] a proggy wig-out." James Reed of the Boston Globe picked the album as one of the best of 2007. The name "No Shouts, No Calls" is a reference to a line from the 2003 film "Master and Commander: The Far Side of the World."

== Track listing ==
All songs written by Electrelane and Verity Susman, except where noted.

1. "The Greater Times" (Electrelane) – 3:42
2. "To the East" – 4:54
3. "After the Call" – 3:04
4. "Tram 21" – 4:30
5. "In Berlin" – 4:14
6. "At Sea" – 4:47
7. "Between the Wolf and the Dog" – 4:05
8. "Saturday" – 3:55
9. "Five" – 6:25
10. "Cut and Run" – 3:27
11. "The Lighthouse" – 4:22

The Japanese release contains the following bonus tracks:

- "Carolina Wren"
- "Sea of the Edge"

== Personnel ==
- Verity Susman – guitar, keyboards, vocals
- Emma Gaze – drums
- Mia Clarke – guitar, vocals
- Ros Murray – organ, bass, cello, ukulele, vocals
- Jessica Ruffins – engineer, mixing
- Bill Skibbe – engineer, mixing
- Steve Rooke – mastering

== Release history ==
Region	Date	Label	Format	Catalog
United Kingdom	30 April 2007	Too Pure	CD	PURE 201CD
United Kingdom	30 April 2007	Too Pure	12" LP	PURE 201LP
Japan	1 May 2007	WEA	CD	WEA 10026
United States	8 May 2007	Too Pure, Beggars Banquet	CD	PURE 142
