= Ghum =

Ghum may refer to:

- Another spelling for the city Qom in Iran
- Ghum, West Bengal, a small hilly locality in the Darjeeling Himalayan hill region of West Bengal, India
  - Ghum Monastery, Buddhist
- GHUM, the London-based post punk band
