= DSFL =

DSFL may refer to:

- DIY Space for London, creative hub and music venue
- Driving Skills for Life, a program of the Ford Motor Company
