= Shacklewell Arms =

Pub and music venue in Dalston, London, England

Coordinates: 51°33′09″N 0°04′17″W

- The front of the pub venue in 2026.
- Interactive map of Shacklewell Arms
- Former names: The Green Man
- Location: 71 Shacklewell Lane, Dalston, London, E8
- Owner: Tom Baker, Dan Crouch
- Capacity: 200
- Events: Punk rock, Indie rock, Indie pop

Construction
- Opened: 2011

Website
- https://www.shacklewellarms.com/

The Shacklewell Arms is a pub and music venue on Shacklewell Lane in Dalston, London.

== History ==
It was built in the 1870s and was originally known as The Green Man after a free house that had stood there before.

From the late 1980s to the early 2010s it was a Saint Lucian pub, and has retained some of the décor from this time. In 2011 it was taken over by Tom Baker, a local gig promoter with Eat Your Own Ears, and Dan Crouch, also involved with The Lock Tavern in Camden. It has since become a popular live music venue for small bands. Unusually for the surrounding area, the Shacklewell Arms has a large garden and courtyard space out the back.

The pub has sponsored tent stages at London festivals Field Day and Wide Awake.

== In popular culture ==
The dance music production duo Shut Up and Dance immortalized the Shacklewell Arms in its former life in their 1991 track The Green Man.

The 18 November 2020 edition of Jimmy Kimmel Live! included a performance by Beabadoobee of her song "Care" that had been pre-recorded at the venue.

A scene from the Black Mirror 2025 episode "Eulogy" was shot in the gig room.

== Notable performers ==
- Battles
- Beabadoobee
- Blood Orange
- Charmpit
- The Cribs
- Django Django
- Ezra Furman
- Fucked Up
- Gilla Band
- Girlpool
- The Growlers
- Haim
- Honeyblood
- The Horrors
- Jamie XX
- Joanna Gruesome
- Parquet Courts
- Perfect Pussy
- Solange Knowles
- Skrillex
- Waxahatchee
