= First Timers =

First Timers may refer to:

- First Timers (festival)
- First Timers (2015), a short film directed by Eric Chambers and produced by Kerry Rossall
