= Rock It to the Moon =

Studio album by Electrelane
- Released: 30 April 2001
- Recorded: September – October 2000
- Genre: Indie rock; post-rock
- Length: 73:55
- Label: Let's Rock! / Mr. Lady

Electrelane chronology
Rock It to the Moon (2001)	The Power Out (2004)

Singles from Rock It to the Moon
- 1. "Film Music" Released: 2000; 2. "Gabriel" Released: 2000; 3. "Blue Straggler" Released: 2001

Professional ratings
Review scores
Source	Rating
Allmusic	3/5 stars
Drowned in Sound	(8/10)
NME	(8/10)
PopMatters	(favorable)
Pitchfork Media	(6.4/10)

Rock It to the Moon is the debut album by the English group Electrelane, released in the UK in 2001 by Let's Rock!, and issued by Mr. Lady Records in the US in 2002. Too Pure, the record label Electrelane signed with for their follow up album, The Power Out (2004), reissued Rock It to the Moon in 2005.

The album was mostly instrumental. Verity Susman explained, "Way way back, when we first started, we always had a lot of singing. But it never worked that well. When we did instrumental it was always more interesting. More completely we felt like we were doing something good, while the songs with the singing ended up quite bog-standard, boring, not very interesting." NME rated the album an 8 out of 10, saying Rock It to the Moon was "just the way a debut album should be... utterly focused [and] stripped of all extraneous flab."

== Track listing ==
1. "The Invisible Dog" (Debbie Ball, Rachel Dalley, Emma Gaze, Verity Susman) – 4:20
2. "Long Dark" (Ball, Mia Clarke, Dalley, Gaze, Susman) – 9:20
3. "Gabriel" (Ball, Dalley, Gaze, Susman) – 4:25
4. "Film Music" (Ball, Gaze, Tracy Houdek, Rupert Noble, Susman) – 3:57
5. "Blue Straggler" (Ball, Dalley, Gaze, Susman) – 6:49
6. "Many Peaks" (Ball, Dalley, Gaze, Susman) – 4:01
7. "Le Song" (Ball, Dalley, Gaze, Susman) – 3:25
8. "Spartakiade" (Ball, Dalley, Gaze, Susman) – 1:41
9. "U.O.R." (Ball, Gaze, Noble, Susman) – 8:42
10. "The Boat" (Dalley) – 4:25
11. "Mother" (Clarke, Dalley, Gaze, Susman) – 22:24

== Personnel ==
- Verity Susman – clarinet, guitar, piano, glockenspiel, saxophone, vocals, handclapping, Farfisa organ, string arrangements
- Emma Gaze – percussion, drums, tambourine, vocals, handclapping, radio
- Rachel Dalley – bass, conga, vocals
- Mia Clarke – guitar
- Katie Spafford – cello
- Roland Susman – trumpet
- Marianne Vaughan – violin
- Polly Benians – handclapping
- Christelle Breedt – handclapping
- Electrelane – producer, mixing
- Jake Rousham – engineer
- Matthew Ryan – producer, engineer, mixing
- Sarah Feltham Chesshire - Viola

== Release history ==
Region	Date	Label	Format	Catalog
United Kingdom	30 April 2001	Let's Rock!	CD	LETS 003
United States	22 January 2002	Mr. Lady Records	CD	22
Worldwide reissue	31 October 2005	Too Pure, Beggars Banquet	CD	PUREL 169CD
