= Singles, B-Sides & Live =

Compilation album by Electrelane
- Released: 21 August 2006
- Recorded: 2000 – 16 June 2005
- Genre: Rock; Post-rock
- Length: 74:09
- Label: Too Pure
- Producer: Andrew Rogers

Electrelane chronology
Axes (2005)	Singles, B-Sides & Live (2006)	No Shouts, No Calls (2007)

Professional ratings
Review scores
Source	Rating
PopMatters	7/10 stars

Singles, B-Sides & Live is a compilation album by English rock group Electrelane. It was released on CD in 2006 by Too Pure. Tracks 7, 8 and 9 are from their EP I Want To Be President.

== Track listing ==
All songs were written by Electrelane, except where noted.

1. "Film Music (Original Version)" – 4:11
2. "Come On" – 4:50
3. "Le Song (Original Version)" – 3:10
4. "U.O.R. (Original Version)" – 5:23
5. "John Wayne" – 2:38
6. "I Love You My Farfisa" – 4:10
7. "I Want to Be President" – 4:46
8. "I Only Always Think" – 5:08
9. "I've Been Your Fan Since Yesterday" – 5:07
10. "I'm on Fire" (Bruce Springsteen) – 2:18
11. "Long Dark (Albini Version)" – 4:14
12. "Oh Sombra! (John Peel Session)" – 3:05
13. "More Than This (Live)" (Bryan Ferry) – 4:34
14. "Birds (Live)" – 4:03
15. "Those Pockets are People / The Partisan (Live)" (Electrelane, Anna Marly, Hy Zaret) – 8:02
16. "Today" – 8:30

== Release history ==
Region	Date	Label	Format	Catalog
United Kingdom	21 August 2006	Too Pure	CD	PURE 166CD
United States	16 October 2006	Too Pure	CD	PURE 166CD
