= Axes (album) =

Studio album by Electrelane
- Released: 9 May 2005
- Recorded: December 2004–January 2005 in Chicago, Illinois
- Genre: Post-rock
- Length: 59:16
- Label: Too Pure

Electrelane chronology
The Power Out (2004)	Axes (2005)	No Shouts, No Calls (2007)

Singles from Axes
- 1. "Bells" Released: 18 April 2005

Professional ratings
Review scores
Source	Rating
Allmusic	3.5/5 stars
Austin Chronicle	3/5 stars
Blender	3/5 stars
Calgary Sun	3/5 stars
New York Times	favorable
PopMatters	(7/10)
Pitchfork Media	(7.3/10)
Stylus Magazine	B
Tiny Mix Tapes	4/5 stars

Axes is the third album by English rock group Electrelane.

For the mostly instrumental album, Electrelane once again returned to Steve Albini's studio in Chicago. In the first recording session for Axes, the band played through the entire album in one take. This reflected the band's desire to have listeners experience the band's live show. Emma Gaze explained the album was recorded "the way we rehearse and practise: we all stand in a circle and it is very relaxed. Our previous recording experiences have been with the bass in one room, the drums in a different room, the two guitarists in a different room and then the vocals are done afterwards. Obviously it works like that because that is how most bands do it. But we just wanted it to sound more live; there is a different kind of energy that comes from playing in the same room." Verity Susman said that "We see the record as a continuous piece of music, not a collection of songs. It also reflects the way we improvise, moving from one idea to the next without a clear break. It’s also how we play live." The album was released on 9 May 2005 to mixed, but generally positive reviews.

== Track listing ==
All songs written by Electrelane and Verity Susman, except where noted.

1. "One, Two, Three, Lots" – 1:44
2. "Bells" – 4:38
3. "Two for Joy" – 5:58
4. "If Not Now, When?" – 5:47
5. "Eight Steps" – 5:01
6. "Gone Darker" – 7:05
7. "Atom's Tomb" – 2:08
8. "Business or Otherwise" – 5:47
9. "Those Pockets Are People" – 5:02
10. "The Partisan" (Anna Marly, Hy Zaret) – 2:32
11. "I Keep Losing Heart" – 3:41
12. "Come Back" – 0:07
13. "Suitcase" (Electrelane, Ros Murray) – 9:46

== Personnel ==
- Verity Susman – organ, guitar, piano, harmonium, saxophone, vocals, brass arrangement, choir arrangement
- Emma Gaze – drums
- Mia Clarke – guitar
- Ros Murray – banjo, bass, cello
- Amy Larsen – trumpet
- Dasun Sinder – French horn
- Chicago a cappella – vocals
- Steve Albini – engineer
- Steve Rooke – mastering

== Release history ==
Region	Date	Label	Format	Catalog
United Kingdom	9 May 2005	Too Pure	CD	PURE 162CD
United Kingdom	9 May 2005	Too Pure	Double LP	PURE 162LP
United States	9 May 2005	Too Pure, Beggars Banquet	CD	PURE 162
