= Charmpit =

British punk band (2016–2022)

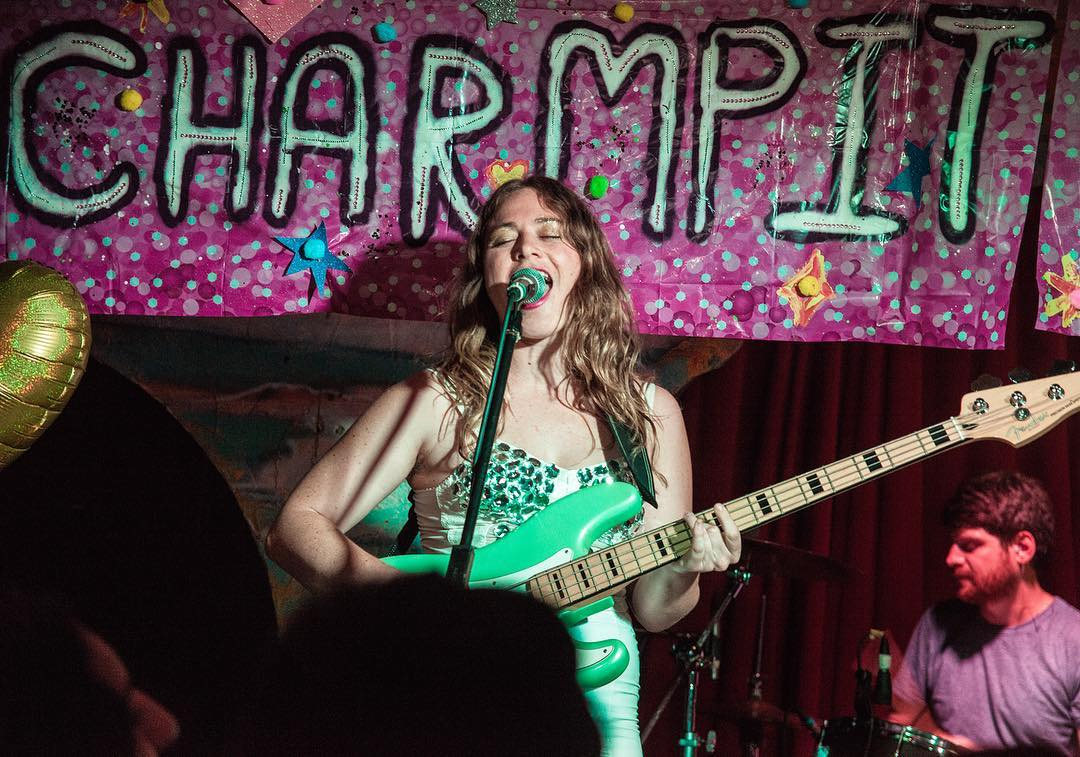
- Charmpit in London in 2017

Background information
- Origin: London, England
- Genres: Indie pop; Punk rock; Riot grrrl
- Years active: 2016–2022
- Past members: Anne Marie Sanguigni; Rhianydd York Williams; Alex Iossifidis; Estella Adeyeri
- Website: charmpit.bandcamp.com

Charmpit was a British punk band formed in London in 2016. Its members were Anne Marie Sanguigni (bass and vocals), Rhianydd YorkWilliams (guitar and vocals), Alex Iossifidis (drums), and Estella Adeyeri (guitar). They released one album on Specialist Subject Records.

== History ==
The band was formed initially as a trio of just Sanguigni, YorkWilliams, and Iossifidis, to play the 2016 First Timers held at DIY Space for London. Members of the band also helped to run later editions of the festival.

Sanguigni and YorkWilliams are both originally from Southern California, meeting at the University of California, Santa Cruz, and separately moved to London shortly before forming the band.

In 2017, they released an EP titled Jelly on Keroleen Records.

Estella Adeyeri, also of Big Joanie, joined the band on guitar in 2018.

In 2020, they released a full-length album, Cause A Stir, on Bristol punk label Specialist Subject Records. This was followed by a split 7" with Big Joanie on Kill Rock Stars.

Charmpit played their final concert at Sebright Arms in Cambridge Heath, East London, on 8 July 2022.

== Discography ==
=== Albums ===
- Cause A Stir - Specialist Subject Records, LP, MP3 (2020)

=== Extended plays ===
- Snorkel - Self released, MP3 (2016)
- Jelly - Keroleen Records, 7" EP, MP3 (2017)

=== Singles ===
- Squirrel Away The Summer ("Squirrel Vision" b/w "It's Always Summer Up My Skirt") - Everything Sucks Records, Cassette single, MP3 (2018)
- Bridges Go Burn - Specialist Subject Records, MP3 (2019)
- Wild Wild Westfield - Specialist Subject Records, MP3 (2020)
- Sophomore Year - Specialist Subject Records, MP3 (2020)
- Kluster Rooms Sessions (Split with Big Joanie) - Kill Rock Stars, 7" single, MP3 (2020)
