= Sistahs =

Studio album by Big Joanie
- Released: November 30, 2018
- Recorded: November 2017 – January 2018
- Studio: Hermitage Works Studio
- Genre: Art punk; post-punk; punk rock
- Length: 31:16
- Label: Daydream Library Series
- Producer: Margo Broom

Sistahs is the debut album of Big Joanie. It was released in 2018 on Thurston Moore and Eva Prinz's Daydream Library Series label after the two saw the band open for The Ex and discovered that the band had yet to release an album.

== Composition ==
Sistahs holds musical footing in art punk, post-punk and "fearlessly discordant" punk rock. It has been noted for pushing the latter genre forward. However, its songs are musically eclectic and experimental, with goth, jangle pop, lo-fi and trance sounds nestled in it.

Leading single "Fall Asleep" is a "tough" dance-punk song that "burst[s] forth with synths and handclaps", recalling 80s and 90s sounds. It also dons a "power pop base" and a "light new wave trance". "Used To Be Friends" takes on early-80s indie pop while echoing riot grrrl. "Down Down" is "sexy" surf rock with "a demented surf pop riff". "How Could You Love Me" has "rolling" melodies of 50s power pop.

== Reception ==
Professional ratings
Aggregate scores
Source	Rating
Metacritic	73/100
Review scores
Source	Rating
The Guardian	3/5 stars
Pitchfork	7.6/10
Rolling Stone	3.5/5 stars

Upon its release, Sistahs was welcomed with generally positive reviews from music critics. On Metacritic, it holds a score of 73 out of 100, indicating "generally favorable reviews", based on four reviews.

The Quietus called the album "a fresh and rich take on DIY punk." Rolling Stone gave the album 3.5 stars and said "It's a record that’s bold, catchy and arresting."

=== Accolades ===
Publication	Country	List	Rank	Ref.
The Quietus	UK	Quietus Albums Of The Year 2018	60	

== Track listing ==
All songs by Big Joanie.

No.	Title	Length
1.	"New Year"	3:17
2.	"Fall Asleep"	2:56
3.	"Used to Be Friends"	2:08
4.	"Eyes"	4:11
5.	"Way Out"	2:08
6.	"Down Down"	1:24
7.	"Tell a Lie"	2:07
8.	"Token"	3:00
9.	"It's You"	2:22
10.	"How Could You Love Me"	3:37
11.	"Cut Your Hair"	4:04
Total length:		31:16

== Personnel ==
All credits adapted from the record's Bandcamp page.

Big Joanie

- Stephanie Phillips - vocals, guitar
- Estella Adeyeri - bass
- Chardine Taylor-Stone - drums

Additional musicians

- Seth Evans - Wurlitzer on "Cut Your Hair"

Technical

- Margo Broom - production, recording, mixing
