= Big Joanie =

British punk band

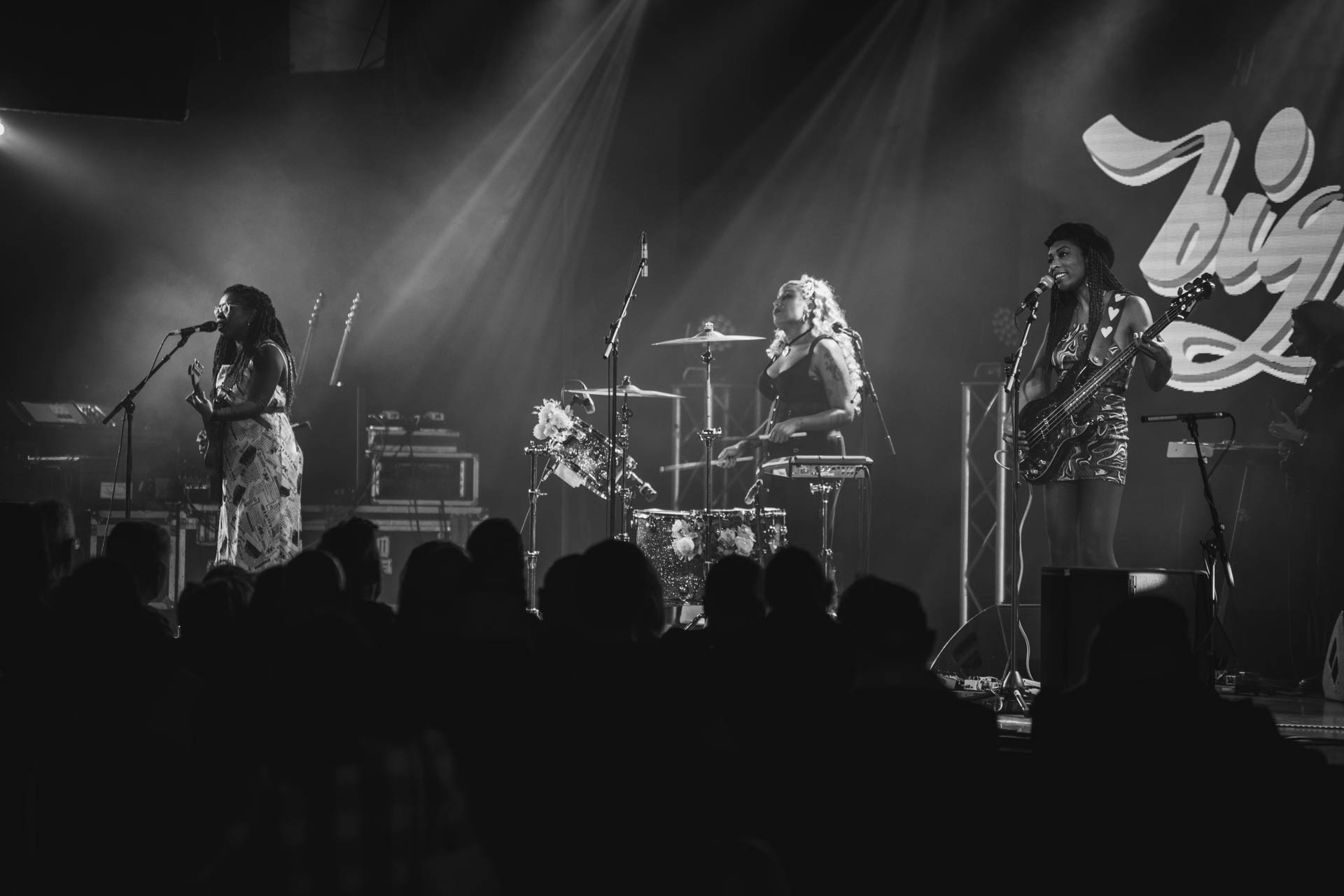
- Big Joanie at Rockaway Beach Festival 2023

Background information
- Origin: London, England
- Genres: Post-punk; punk rock; riot grrrl
- Years active: 2013–present
- Labels: Tuff Enuff Records; Sistah Punk Records; Ecstatic Peace Library; Kill Rock Stars
- Members: Stephanie Phillips; Estella Adeyeri
- Past members: Kiera Coward-Deyell; Chardine Taylor-Stone

Big Joanie is a British punk band formed in London in 2013. Its members are Stephanie Phillips (guitar and vocals) and Estella Adeyeri (bass guitar and vocals). Founding drummer Chardine Taylor-Stone left the band in 2023. After a few singles and EPs they released their first album in 2018 with Thurston Moore and Eva Prinz's Daydream Library Series, and have since signed to Kill Rock Stars in the U.S.

== History ==
=== Formation and early releases ===
Big Joanie was formed by Stephanie Phillips in 2013, who posted online asking for bandmates with whom to start a black feminist punk band after becoming frustrated with the lack of intersectionality in the scene. Chardine Taylor-Stone, who Phillips had met through a Black Feminist meet-up group, and the band's original bassist Kiera Coward-Deyell both responded to the social media post. They played their first set at the inaugural First Timers, an event where all the bands had to be new, most of the members had to be playing a new instrument and they had to include someone from a marginalised group.

The name of the band is partly a tribute to Phillips’ mother, Joan, and partly based on a Caribbean figure of speech. "When we say a child is 'acting big', they're acting bigger than themselves. I just thought that would be a great phrase for a strong, confident woman."

In 2014 the band released their first EP Sistah Punk on Tuff Enuff Records, and in 2016 they self released a 7" three song single entitled Crooked Room on their own Sistah Punk Records. The title track is inspired by a lecture by the writer Melissa Harris-Perry, who compared life as a black woman in a white patriarchy to trying to find a true vertical in a room where everything is crooked. Another song on the release is a punk cover of No Scrubs by TLC.

=== Line-up change and Decolonise Fest ===
Estella Adeyeri (also of Witching Waves and Charmpit) joined in 2017 to replace Coward-Deyell after she moved to Scotland. Later that year the band supported American bands Sad13 and Downtown Boys on UK tours. In early 2018 they recorded their debut album with producer Margo Broom at Hermitage Works Studios.

Over the weekend of 2–4 June 2017, DIY Diaspora Punx (a collective started by Phillips and also containing other London musicians such as Ray Aggs) put on the first Decolonise Fest at DIY Space For London. Decolonise Fest is the UK's first music festival created by and for people of colour. The second edition of the festival, again mostly held at DIY Space, occurred from 22 to 24 June 2018. The festival was held for a third time over 29 to 30 June 2019, at which Big Joanie performed.

=== Release of debut album ===
On 5 September 2018 Big Joanie announced their debut album Sistahs would be released in late November the same year with a music video for lead single "Fall Asleep". It is the first album to be released by Ecstatic Peace Library, a publishing company ran by visual book editor Eva Prinz and musician Thurston Moore, in their Daydream Library Series.

Sistahs was released on 30 November to positive reviews, including in The Guardian, Rolling Stone, and The Quietus.

In November 2018 they supported American band Parquet Courts on a UK and European tour. They played their first American shows in March 2019 at South by Southwest, debuting via BBC Music Introducing, and were announced in April as Bikini Kill's main support for their two European shows of the year at Brixton Academy in June.

On 26 February 2020, Big Joanie supported Sleater-Kinney alongside Harkin at the Brixton Academy. Phillips cites Sleater-Kinney as having "really influenced the way I thought about writing emotional songs, and my approach to punk music".

On 14 August that year the band released a 7" single of their cover of Solange's Cranes in the Sky with a live recording of It's You from their first album on the flip. On 2 October it was announced that Big Joanie had signed in the U.S. to Portland OR based independent record label Kill Rock Stars ahead of their second album. Their first release for the label was a split with Adeyeri's other band Charmpit, which was released on 27 November that year.

=== Back Home ===
On 1 June 2022, Big Joanie released the single Happier Still, it was written after the release of the debut album and finished whilst they were in Austin for SXSW 2019. On 27 July 2022, Pitchfork revealed that their second album, titled Back Home, was to be released on 4 November that year. The album received positive reviews that mention its "expansive" sound and "breadth of style". On 5 October 2023, Big Joanie announced that Taylor-Stone left the band.

== Discography ==
=== Albums ===
- Sistahs – Daydream Library Series, LP, MP3 (2018)
- Back Home - Kill Rock Stars / Daydream Library Series, LP, CD, MP3 (2022)

=== EPs ===
- Sistah Punk – Tuff Enuff Records, Cassette, MP3 (2014)
- Crooked Room – Sistah Punk Records, 7", MP3 (2016)

=== Singles ===
- Cranes in the Sky / It's You – Third Man Records, 7" (2020)
- Kluster Rooms Sessions (Split with Charmpit) - Kill Rock Stars, 7" (2020)
- Happier Still - Kill Rock Stars / Daydream Library Series, MP3 (2022)
