= Amersham Arms =

Pub in Lewisham, London, England

Coordinates: 51°28′33″N 0°01′57″W

The Amersham Arms
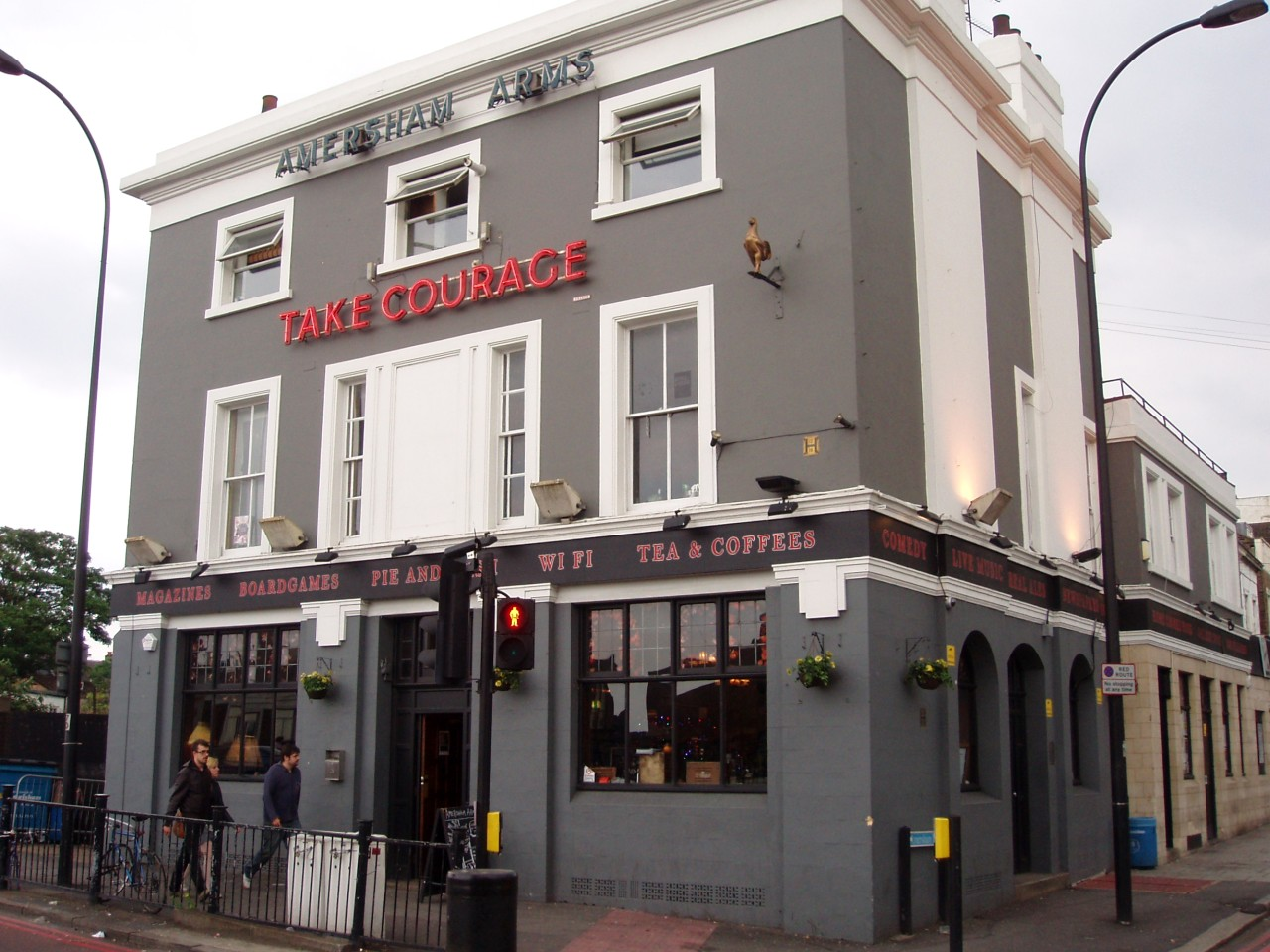
- Interactive map of The Amersham Arms
- Location: 388 New Cross Rd, Lewisham, London, SE14

The Amersham Arms is a pub and music venue located at 388 New Cross Road, in the New Cross area of the London Borough of Lewisham in south-east London.

== History ==
A pub of that name has been present on New Cross Road since at least the 1850s, and from the 1920s to the 1940s was known as the Amersham Hotel.

On 23 October 1954 it was the venue for the first big meeting of the local Anglo Caribbean Association and Club, a group set up by Windrush era West Indian migrants to provide practical support and social activities, as well as organise against racism.

By the 1960s the pub was a venue for jazz concerts.

Suede performed an early concert at the pub on 12 February 1992, with Brett Anderson remembering only one person in attendance. Menswear and Bush performed there on separate occasions in 1994.

Other acts to perform there in the 1990s include Squeeze, Sidi Bou Said, Extreme Noise Terror, Marty Friedman, Daisy Chainsaw, Sepultura, Gene and Spearmint.

In 2007 the pub was relaunched by the management team behind the Lock Tavern in Camden. At this point the venue had a licence to be open until 4am at the weekends.

Chas and Dave performed there twice in 2007, with Wilko Johnson also playing the same year. Jonathan Richman performed there in 2010.

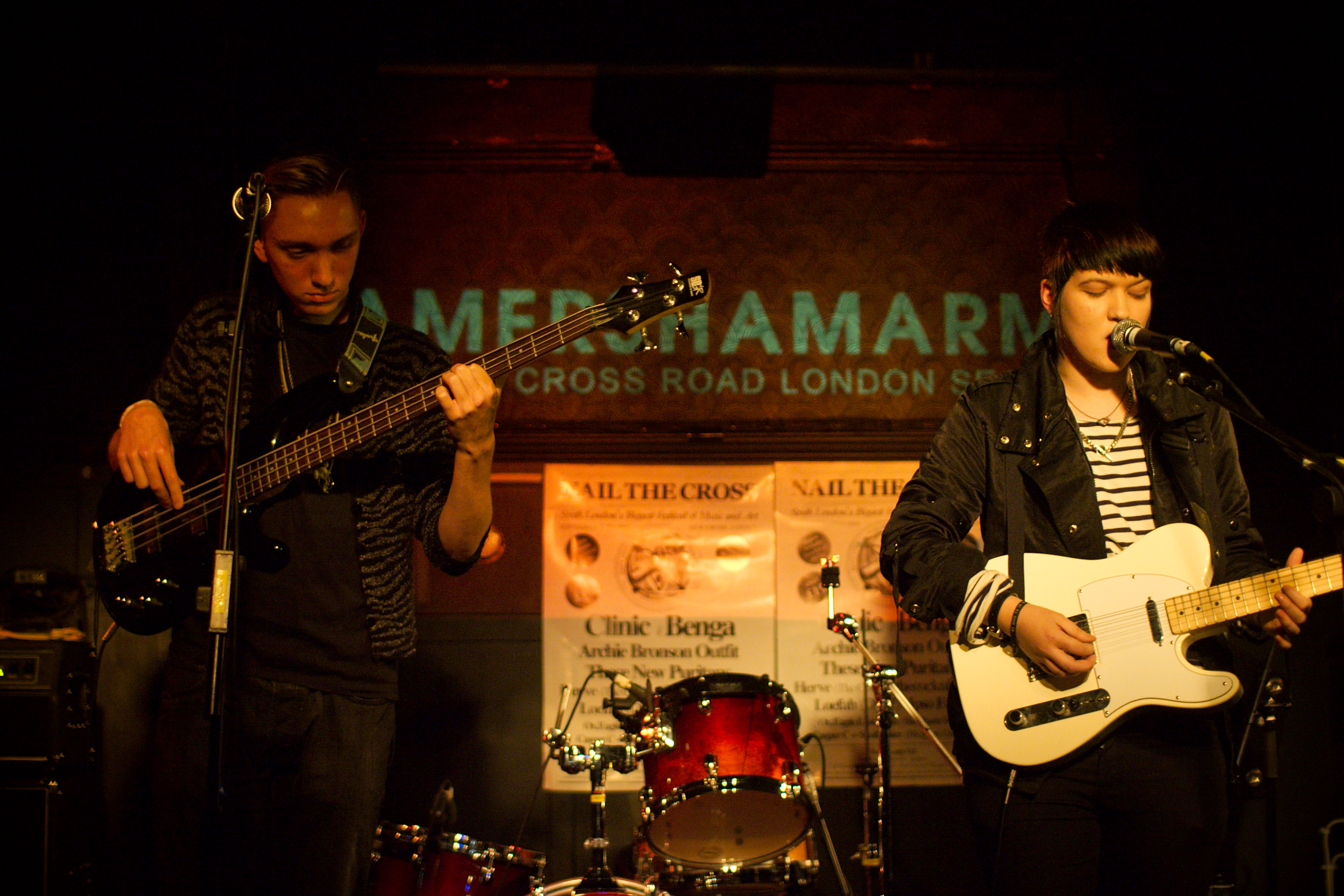
The XX performing at The Amersham Arms in 2008

In the late 2000s and early 2010s it was a regular venue for the UK independent rock, grime, and dubstep scenes, as well as occasional international touring acts. Acts like The XX, Sea Power, Art Brut, These New Puritans, Wild Beasts, Foals, Holy Fuck, Liars, No Age, Hudson Mohawke, Skepta, Wiley, Benga, and Kode9 all performed there.

In 2014 ex-The Libertines guitarist and singer Carl Barât held auditions for musicians to join his new band in the pub.

In 2022 it was the venue for that year's First Timers.

The pub has for some time had a neon sign mounted on the front bearing the slogan of Courage Brewery, Take Courage, from when it was part of that brand. A gallery space above the pub is named after it.

A long-running comedy night named Happy Mondays runs there fortnightly. Comedians to have performed at the night include Stewart Lee, Cardinal Burns, Russell Howard, Shaparak Khorsandi, Andy Parsons, Andi Osho, Arthur Smith, Sarah Millican, Greg Davies, Milton Jones, Dane Baptiste, Robin Ince, and Al Murray. Simon Day used to compere a previous comedy night there called the Rub-a-Dub Club.
