= Panic Pocket =

British indie pop band

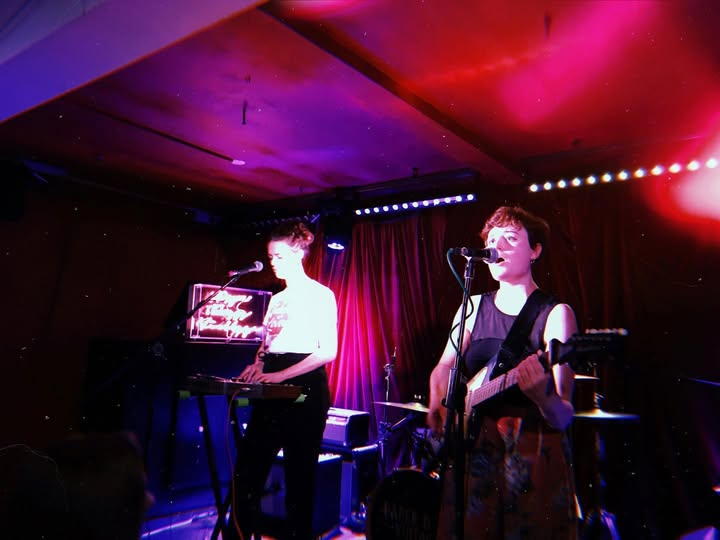
- Panic Pocket at Paper Dress in London in 2020

Background information
- Origin: London, England
- Genres: Indie pop; Synth pop
- Years active: 2017–present
- Members: Natalie Healey; Sophie Peacock
- Website: panicpocket.bandcamp.com

Panic Pocket are an indie pop duo from London, England, consisting of guitarist Natalie Healey and keyboard player Sophie Peacock. They have released one album and one EP on independent record labels.

== History ==
Having known each other since childhood, Natalie Healey (guitar, vocals) and Sophie Peacock (synthesiser, vocals) started writing songs together to perform at First Timers 2017.

Panic Pocket released their debut EP Never Gonna Happen on Derbyshire label Reckless Yes in 2019.

In 2023 their first full-length album, Mad Half Hour, was released on Skep Wax (an independent record label run by members of the band Heavenly).

The duo have played concerts with artists such as Heavenly, Would-Be-Goods, The Research, and Rachel Love of Dolly Mixture.

== Discography ==
=== Albums ===
- Mad Half Hour - Skep Wax (2023)

=== EPs ===
- Never Gonna Happen - Reckless Yes (2019)
