= BUFU Records =

American independent record label

- Founded: 2012
- Founder: Ben Katzman
- Distributors: Redeye Distribution; Carrot Top
- Genre: Noise rock, punk, indie rock, post-punk
- Country of origin: U.S.
- Location: Boston, Massachusetts
- Official website: www.bufurecords.com

BUFU (By Us For Us) Records is an independent record label formed in 2012 and based in Boston, Massachusetts.

Originally releasing cassettes and CDs for New England–based DIY rock artists, the label has expanded to include international artists and has released 77 titles spanning across all physical and digital platforms. Their artists have had premieres or features in publications such as Billboard magazine, SPIN, Brooklyn Vegan, and Tom Tom Magazine, and have received recognition from Rolling Stone, NME, and Stereogum.

The label's includes Tall Juan, Flower Girl, Veiny Hands, Ben Katzman's DeGreaser, Free Pizza, and The Jellyfish Brothers.

== History ==
BUFU Records was founded in 2012 by Ben Katzman, who is a former member of Guerilla Toss as well as the frontman of his own group Ben Katzman's DeGreaser. Christopher Collins of The Boston Hassle joined as co-owner in 2014, and by then the label had already been well established in the Boston area, having issued nearly 30 releases and booking national tours for its artists. The label has put out releases from Japanther, Krill, and Mannequin Pussy, for which they released either LPs or a special edition cassette. Additionally, they have partnered with Boston Hassle Fest on occasion to release live compilation tapes of the annual music festival.

Over the years, the label has built a reputation for their tape releases, which greatly outnumber their vinyl releases. Many of their artists have gone on to sign to larger record labels as well, such as IAN who went on to sign with Hardly Art. Additionally, they have booked concert tours for their artists, and have organized their own BUFU Festival in their base location of Boston and in Katzman's hometown of Miami, Florida.

The label's roster includes Tall Juan, Flower Girl, Veiny Hands, Ben Katzman's DeGreaser, Free Pizza, and The Jellyfish Brothers. Tall Juan released Olden Goldies via BUFU Records in May 2017, which garnered him a highly acclaimed appearance at Coachella Music Festival. Additionally, the label has gone on to release comic books such as in conjunction with Ben Katzman's DeGreaser's release We Bled to Shred.

== Notable releases ==
- Designer – "Kelvin & Kline" (2013). Designer is listed No. 9 in "Best 40 New Bands of 2013" by Stereogum.
- Japanther – "Instant Money Magic" (LP only) (2014). Lead single "Do It (Don't Try)" premiered on SPIN magazine.
- Tall Juan – "Why Not?" (2015). Recorded and engineered by Mac DeMarco.
- Mannequin Pussy – "Romantic" (Special Edition Cassette only) (2016). Listed No. 3 in "Top 20 Albums of 2016" by Rolling Stone.
- Las Nubes & Palomino Blond - "Split EP" (2020)
