= Four Songs by Arthur Russell =

EP by Various
- Released: 20 August 2007
- Label: Rough Trade

Four Songs by Arthur Russell is a tribute EP of songs written by Arthur Russell, featuring Vera November, Jens Lekman, Taken By Trees, and Joel Gibb.

== Track listing ==
1. "Our Last Night Together" (Vera November)
2. "A Little Lost" (Jens Lekman)
3. "Make 1, 2" (Taken By Trees)
4. "That's Us/Wild Combination" (Joel Gibb)
