= Ray Aggs =

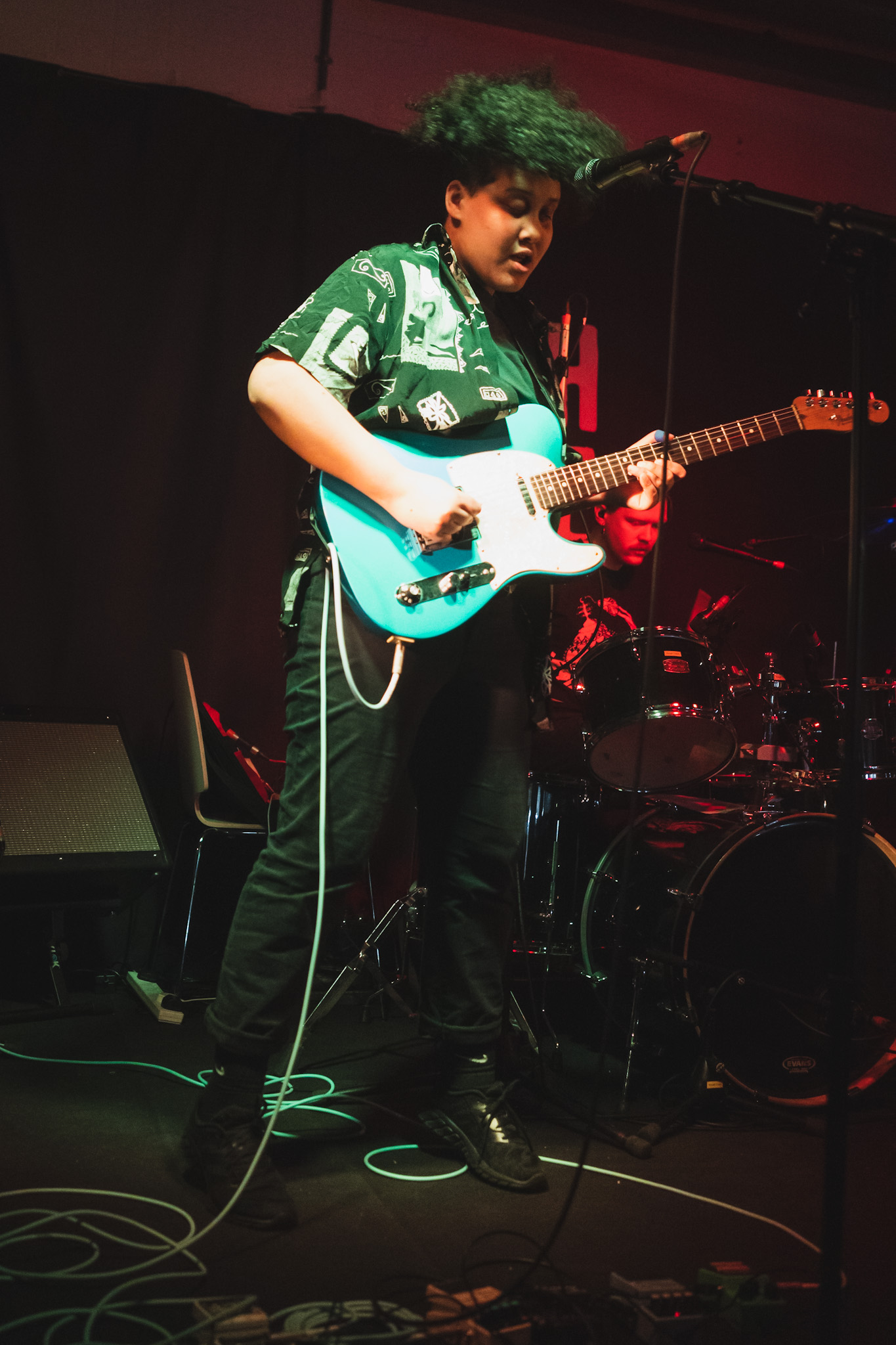
- Aggs in 2020

Background information
- Genres: Post-punk, indie pop
- Occupation: Musician
- Instruments: Vocals; guitar; violin
- Years active: 2009–present
- Labels: FatCat Records, Upset The Rhythm, Slumberland Records, Rock Action Records, Merge Records, Mïlk Records
- Member of: Trash Kit; Sacred Paws; Shopping

Ray Aggs is a musician based in Glasgow. Primarily known for their distinctive guitar work, influenced by both West African highlife and post-punk, they also sing and play the violin.

== Career ==
They have been playing with the band Trash Kit since 2009, formed with Rachel Horwood and Ros Murray (later replaced by Gill Partington), releasing 3 albums on the Upset! The Rhythm Indie-label, a self-titled record in 2010, Confidence, in 2014 and Horizon in 2019.

Aggs was also a member of Shopping, formed with Andrew Milk and Billy Easter, from 2012 to 2025. Other bands have included The Madrigals, Covergirl, Golden Grrrls, and Sacred Paws, who released their debut EP in 2015.

In June 2017, Sacred Paws debut album Strike A Match, released the previous January, was awarded Scottish Album of the Year.

They have written several zines, including I Trust My Guitar and DIY Guitar for beginners. Aggs has often been featured in the Shotgun Seamstress zine, a book of when re-released had Aggs involved in a discussion panel of Black zinesters at Martin Luther King Jr. Memorial Library in Washington D.C. in 2022.

Following the theme of their zines, Aggs has taught guitar in workshops, one called Decolonising The Guitar and as part of the workshop series leading up to First Timers festival at DIY Space For London.

Between 2011-2015 they worked at Power Lunches in Dalston, East London, active in the scene cultivated at the venue.

They were a contributor to performance of the Pauline Oliveros score To Valerie Solanas and Marilyn Monroe, In Recognition of their Desperation in a performance in the Turbine Hall, Tate Modern, 2012. As well as on a second occasion in a film-based performance with other musicians Peaches, Catriona Shaw, Verity Susman, Ginger Brooks Takahashi, and William Wheeler in a film of the same name by artists Pauline Boudry / Renate Lorenz and shown at Museum of Modern Art, New York, in a special event with the artists, Oliveros and Gregg Bordowitz in May 2014.

On 14 April 2018 Aggs performed at the Barbican as part of a 12 guitarist group assembled by Thurston Moore; along with Deborah Goodge, Susan Stenger, Jonah Falco, Joseph Coward, and more. In 2022 Aggs was in Nikita Gale's Frieze installation 63/62 alongside other musicians Alpha Maid and Joviale.

In 2020 Aggs started releasing and performing solo music, now under the name R.Aggs. Their first solo EP, recorded the year before, as part of the second series of Lost Map Records' 'Visitations' subscription service. Each release in the series is recorded by the artist whilst staying in a bothy on the isle of Eigg, where the label is based, in the Scottish Inner Hebrides. Aggs also composed the song Another Road for the 2021 Netflix film Hilda and the Mountain King alongside Vice Cooler.

== Discography ==
=== Solo ===
- Visitations 0202 - Lost Map Records, 12” EP, CD, MP3 (2020)
- //TAPE 1// - Self release, Cassette, MP3 (2020)
- Another Road - Soundtrack, Hilda and The Mountain King, MP3 (2021)

=== Golden Grrrls ===
- Golden Grrrls – Slumberland Records / Night School, 12" LP, CD, MP3 (2013)

=== Sacred Paws ===
- Strike a Match – Rock Action, 12" LP, CD, MP3 (2017)
- Run Around the Sun – Rock Action (UK/EU) / Merge Records (US), 12" LP, CD, MP3 (2019)
- Jump Into Life – Merge Records, 12" LP, CD (2025)

=== Shopping ===
- Consumer Complaints - Mïlk Records/ FatCat Records, 12" LP, CD, MP3 (2013)
- Why Choose - FatCat Records, 12" LP, CD, MP3 (2015)
- The Official Body - FatCat Records, 12" LP, CD, MP3 (2018)
- All or Nothing - FatCat Records, 12" LP, CD, MP3 (2020)

=== Trash Kit ===
- Trash Kit - Upset The Rhythm, 12" LP, CD, MP3 (2010)
- Confidence - Upset The Rhythm, 12" LP, CD, MP3 (2014)
- Horizon - Upset The Rhythm, 12" LP, CD, MP3 (2019)
