= Verity Susman =

English musician, composer

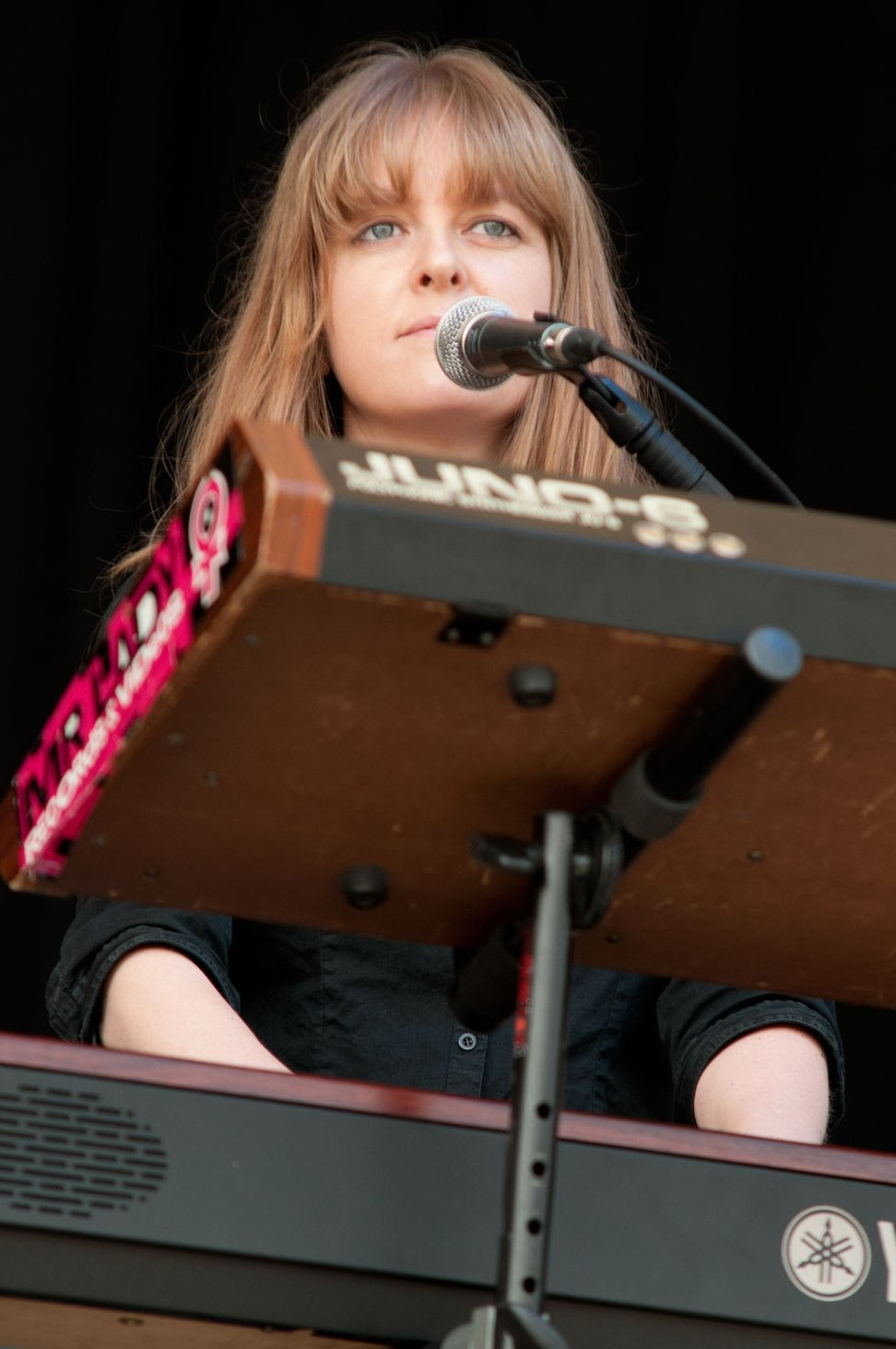
- Susman performing with Electrelane in 2022

Background information
- Also known as: Vera November
- Origin: Brighton, England
- Genres: Indie rock; post-rock
- Occupations: Songwriter; lyricist; composer; arranger; singer; instrumentalist; record producer
- Instruments: Vocals; piano; keyboards; saxophone; clarinet; recorder; guitar; sampler
- Years active: 1998–present
- Labels: Too Pure; Let's Rock
- Website: www.veritysusman.com

Verity Susman is an English songwriter, composer, singer and multi-instrumentalist. She is best known as a founding member and the frontwoman of the English indie rock band Electrelane.

== Music career ==
Following classical piano, clarinet and saxophone lessons as a child and teenager, Susman formed the band Electrelane with drummer Emma Gaze soon after leaving school. The band released four albums, an EP, multiple singles and a Singles, B-Sides & Live compilation album between 2000 and 2007. Verity was lead singer and played keyboards, guitar and saxophone in the band. As they evolved from the post-rock sound of their mostly instrumental first album Rock It to the Moon, Verity Susman grew bolder in her role as the arranger and main songwriting force in the band. She took on singing and lyric-writing duties on their acclaimed second album The Power Out, also composing and arranging a song for choir called The Valleys, with lyrics drawn from Siegfried Sassoon's poem A Letter Home. Both this album and the following, more experimental, Axes, were recorded by Steve Albini at Electrical Audio. Albini praised Susman's musical abilities during an Q & A saying "Verity is a fantastic musician with the capacity to hear impossibly complex arrangements in her head, and I admire that".

In 2007 Susman started performing live and releasing music as the solo project Vera November. The single Red Dream was released as part of Too Pure Singles Club in 2007. She also took part in Jens Lekman's Arthur Russell cover project, singing Our Last Night Together on Rough Trade’s Four Songs by Arthur Russell compilation EP. Writing for Pitchfork, Mark Hogan declared: "Susman [...] steals the show, [...] (her) flitting, double-tracked vocals give the melancholy lyrics an emotional reality only heightened by her bare, evocative piano playing (Lekman name-checks Satie). Susman's version of the song was remixed in 2012 by Nicolás Jaar for his BBC Essential Mix as Last Night Together (You're Coming Back Edit).

In the 2010s Susman deepened her composition skills with a Master of Music degree in Studio Composition from Goldsmiths College, University of London. This led her to compose several Electroacoustic pieces, focusing particularly on cut-up spoken word in works akin to forms of sound collage and sound poetry. This experimentalism informed subsequent compositions, including most notably a commission by The Wire magazine for their John Cage Centenary concert series in 2012; and in 2013, a commission by Scottish Film to perform a live original soundtrack for the 1922 Benjamin Christensen film Häxan as part of BFI's Gothic Season . Verity's performances of the soundtrack in Edinburgh, Dundee and Glasgow proved popular and she was asked to reprise the live score in Paris in 2019. Further commissions followed, including a soundtrack for contemporary dance company Project O's Voodoo performance at Sadler's Wells in 2017. Susman composed her first original soundtrack for a feature film in 2013 when French filmmaker Katell Quillévéré asked her to write the score for the Adèle Haenel-starring Suzanne. That same year, she used SoundCloud to release some solo tracks under her own name; the song To Make You Afraid was singled out as a Baroque Pop gem by Pitchfork. Also in 2013, Verity performed Pauline Oliveros' score To Valerie Solanas and Marilyn Monroe in Recognition of their Desperation in an art film by Pauline Boudry and Renate Lorenz, with fellow musical artists Peaches and Ray Aggs amongst others.

Throughout the 2010s Verity diversified the scope of her live performances, performing solo shows of ever-evolving new material, often involving multimedia elements, most notably at Yoko Ono’s Meltdown Festival and in support of the band Savages and French singer Étienne Daho. During this time, she was also playing saxophone in free improvisation groups, including with The London Improvisers Orchestra, with Maya Dunietz, and in groups including Steve Beresford and fellow Too Pure alumnus Matthew Simms (It Hugs Back, Wire). It is with the latter that Susman started working during the pandemic on soundtracks to the Sonia Gonzalez-directed documentary Women Against The Bomb and the Kevin Hegge-directed documentary Tramps!. Simms and Susman named the project MEMORIALS and both documentaries premiered in March 2022 (the former being televised). Susman, Simms and Kat Duma received a Canadian Screen Award nomination for Best Original Music in a Documentary at the 12th Canadian Screen Awards in 2024 for their work on Tramps!. Simms and Susman later signed to Fire Records for the MEMORIALS albums Memorial Waterslides (2024) and All Clouds Bring Not Rain (2026).

As a guest musician-writer Verity has recorded piano and keyboards on songs by Taken By Trees and Étienne Daho, and saxophone on songs by Beatrice Dillon, Frànçois & the Atlas Mountains, Trash Kit, It Hugs Back and Bamboo. She has performed live as a guest musician with The Raincoats, Deerhunter and The Hidden Cameras.
