= First Timers (festival) =

- Genre: Punk rock, Indie rock
- Locations: At 195 Mare Street (then squatted) and Power Lunches (2013); DIY Space for London (2016 to 2019); Amersham Arms (2022); The Victoria, Dalston (2023 to 2024); Oslo, Hackney (2025)
- Years active: 2013 - present

First Timers is a yearly series of workshops in London, England, culminating in a two-day festival that encourages "new faces and voices in bands", in order to "do something about the lack of diversity in the music community".

== Background ==
The festival was founded by Bryony Beynon of Good Throb, inspired by similar events in North America, with the first events happening in 2013.

To take part, one or more band members have never been in a band before or one or more members has never performed that role in a band before, and one or more band members has to belong to a group marginalised in society. This includes being disabled, transgender, queer, non-binary, LGBTQIA+, a person of colour, or a woman.

Bands that emerged from the festival include Big Joanie, Whitelands, Charmpit, Breakup Haircut, Primetime, Scrap Brain, Slags and Panic Pocket. Speaking with The Guardian in 2019, an organiser with the festival reported that nearly 90 bands had formed to play the festival up to that point.

The 2018 edition of the festival was held at DIY Space for London on 5 and 6 May. Beynon also organised an iteration of the festival in Sydney, Australia on 14 July 2018. The 2022 edition was held on 8 May at the Amersham Arms in New Cross. The 2023 edition was held on 28 May at The Victoria in Dalston. The 2024 edition was held at the same venue on 5 May.
