= Chardine Taylor-Stone =

Black British feminist activist

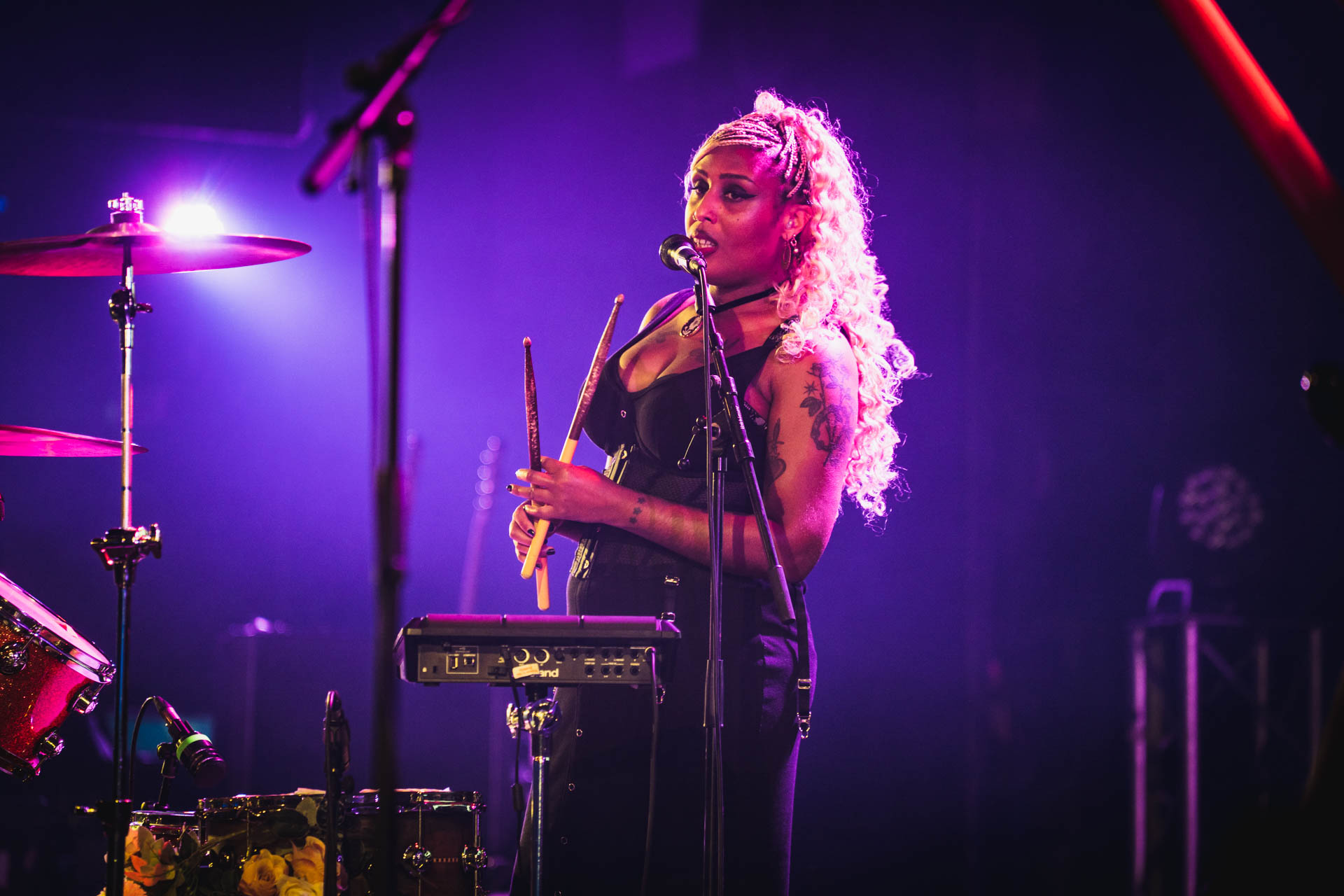
- Taylor-Stone on stage in punk band Big Joanie
- Born: London, England
- Education: Birkbeck, University of London
- Occupations: Writer, musician and activist
- Known for: Activism such as the Stop Rainbow Racism Campaign; former drummer in Big Joanie

Chardine Taylor-Stone is a British feminist activist, writer and musician. She was the drummer of punk band Big Joanie between 2013 and 2023. She founded Stop Rainbow Racism to campaign against the performance of "blackface" at LGBTQ+ venues in 2015.

== Early life and education ==
Taylor-Stone was born in London, England, and is from a working-class background. She was raised in Kettering, Northamptonshire, where at the age of 17 she first became politically active in the Stop the War Coalition. She studied for a BA degree in Arts and Humanities and a master's degree in law (LLM) at Birkbeck, University of London.

== Career ==
Taylor-Stone was the original drummer for the band Big Joanie, started in 2013.

In December 2015, Taylor-Stone founded Stop Rainbow Racism to campaign against the performance of "blackface" at LGBTQ+ venues. The campaign began in response to a performance by drag queen Charlie Hides at The Royal Vauxhall Tavern.

In 2015, Taylor-Stone organised an intergenerational one-day conference "Black British Feminism: Past, Present and Futures" at the Black Cultural Archives in Brixton with Black feminist and friend of Olive Morris, Liz Obi. In 2016, Taylor-Stone co-founded Black Girls Picnic with cultural activist Kayza Rose. In 2017, Taylor-Stone won the British LGBT Award for Contribution to LGBT+ life for the Stop Rainbow Racism campaign. In 2021, she returned the award in protest at the award's sponsorship of MI5 and MI6.

Taylor-Stone has written and spoken about Black British Feminism, racism in LGBT Communities, British working-class life, Afrofuturism, music and socialism. In 2022, Big Joanie were nominated for Best Alternative Act at the MOBO Awards.

On 5 October 2023, the band announced that Taylor-Stone had left, replaced by an interim drummer for their European tour that month.

Taylor-Stone is currently writing music and performing with Border Widow along with Hatty Carman.

== Awards and recognition ==
- British LGBT Award for Contribution to LGBT+ life (2017)
- The Voice newspaper's Women Who Rocked the World (2015)
- The Most Inspiring British LGBT People Of 2016
- Pride Power List 2018
- Pride Power List 2019

== Essays ==
- Opoku-Gyimah, Phyll; Beadle-Blair, Rikki; Gordon, John R. (2018). Sista! : an anthology of writing by and about Same Gender Loving Women of African/Caribbean descent with a UK connection. London. ISBN 978-0-9955162-4-3. OCLC 1006298766.
