= Bamboo (British band) =

British musical duo

Bamboo are a British musical duo made up of Nick Carlisle and Rachel Horwood. They formed in 2014 and have released the albums Prince Pansori Priestess (2015), The Dragon Flies Away (2016) and Daughters of the Sky (2019). Carlisle contributes keyboards and production; Horwood contributes vocals, electric banjo, and drums. For live performances they have included a drummer and bass player.

== Discography ==
=== Albums ===
- Prince Pansori Priestess (Upset the Rhythm, 2015)
- The Dragon Flies Away (Crumb Cabin, 2016)
- Daughters of the Sky (Upset The Rhythm, 2019) – includes Emma Gatrill on harp

== See also ==
- Peepholes (band) – another duo with Carlisle
- Trash Kit – another band with Horwood
