= Jump Into Life =

Studio album by Sacred Paws
- Released: March 28, 2025
- Genre: Pop; indie rock
- Length: 31:35
- Label: Merge, Rock Action

Sacred Paws chronology
Run Around the Sun (2019)	Jump Into Life (2025)

Singles from Jump Into Life
- 1. "Another Day" Released: 22 November 2024; 2. "Turn Me Down" Released: 4 February 2025

Jump Into Life is the third studio album by Scottish indie-pop band Sacred Paws. It was released on 28 March 2025, by Merge Records in the US and Rock Action Records in the UK.

== Background ==
Consisting of eleven songs ranging between two and four minutes each, the album centers on the theme of relationships. It incorporates elements of pop and indie rock along with Afrobeats.

The album's two singles, "Another Day" and "Turn Me Down", were released on 22 November 2024 and 4 February 2025.

== Reception ==
Professional ratings
Review scores
Source	Rating
AllMusic	4/5 stars
Clash	8/10 stars
The Skinny	4/5 stars

AllMusic's Tim Sendra described the Jump Into Life as a "another near-perfect pop album," BrooklynVegan commented on its musical style, stating "this is joyous indie rock filtered through Afrobeat and, this time, a few traditional UK folk touches as well."

The Quietus wrote that the album is "uncompromising in giving us that trademark upbeat and joyously frantic Sacred Paws sound but in its additional textures and layered levels of meaning, there's a maturity and freshness that feels like a step forward for the duo."

Clash Magazine, rating the album eight out of ten, wrote in its review that "Not wallowing in melancholy, quite the opposite, Jump Into Life has a thread of joie de vivre running right through it." The Skinny gave the album a rating of four stars and stated "Filled with effervescent joy, despite its lyrics of heartbreak and healing, Jump Into Life is pure catharsis in all senses of the word."

The Line of Best Fit remarked about the album, "Inspired by a love of indie rock and afropop, the two built a bright, rhythmic sound brimming with horns that lift spirits even if they aren't strictly spiritual."

== Track listing ==
All tracks are written by Ray Aggs and Eilidh Rodgers.

Jump Into Life track listing
No.	Title	Length
1.	"Save Something"	3:04
2.	"Another Day"	3:01
3.	"Fall for You"	2:30
4.	"Simple Feeling"	2:20
5.	"Through the Dark"	2:29
6.	"Turn Me Down"	3:18
7.	"Jump Into Life"	2:42
8.	"Slowly Slowly"	3:03
9.	"Ask Myself"	3:34
10.	"Winter"	2:56
11.	"Draw a Line"	2:39
Total length:		33:36

== Personnel ==
Credits adapted from the album's liner notes and Tidal.

=== Sacred Paws ===
- Ray Aggs – vocals, guitar, production
- Eilidh Rodgers – vocals, drums, production

=== Additional contributors ===
- Tony Doogan – production, mixing
- Seonaid Aitkin – violin (1, 3, 10)
- Liam Brolly – viola (1, 3, 10)
- Alice Allen – cello (1, 3, 10)
- Paul Towndrow – saxophone (1, 6, 7, 9. 11)
- Michael Owens – trombone (1, 6, 7, 9, 11)
- Matthew Gough – trumpet (1, 6, 7, 9, 11)
- Lewis Cook – synthesizer (2, 3, 5, 9, 11)
- Chris Aggs – banjo (2)
- Jack Mellin – guitar (3, 8)
- Genevieve Murphy – words (7)
- Frank Arwkright – mastering
- Oliver Pitt – artwork, design
- DLT – additional layout
