= Las Nubes =

American Alternative rock band

- Origin: Miami, Florida, US.
- Genres: Shoegaze; Garage Rock; Alternative Rock; Punk Rock; Dream Pop
- Years active: 2014–present
- Labels: Sweat Records Records; BUFU Records; Ecstatic Peace Library; Godless America; Spinda Records
- Members: Ale Campos; Emile Milgrim
- Website: www.lasnubesband.com

Las Nubes (formerly Smut) is a multilingual garage rock band from Miami, Florida. The group is composed of Ale Campos (vocals and guitars) and Emile Milgrim (percussion). They have recorded for labels such as BUFU Records and Thurston Moore's Ecstatic Peace Library.

== History ==
Las Nubes debuted in 2014 with Matter That Soils Blackens which was self-released under the Smut name (sometimes stylized as Smvt) as a solo project from Ale Campos. Her follow up, the Conveniently Broken EP was ranked 15th in the "Best Bandcamp releases of 2015" list from Fact.

The project then expanded with the addition of Emile Milgrim in 2017. After adopting the Las Nubes name, they released their debut album SMVT via Sweat Records Records in 2019. That same year, Las Nubes were named "band of the year" by Miami New Times.

At the 2019 Miami Art Week, Las Nubes backed Iggy Pop for a set of songs by The Stooges. After this, Iggy would play Las Nubes on his BBC 6 Music show, and Campos would feature in his "Loves Missing" music video before joining his band as guitarist.

In March 2020, Las Nubes released a split EP with Palomino Blond on BUFU Records, which saw their music featured by BrooklynVegan, Talkhouse, NPR Music, and Filter.

They followed this with LIVE NUBES: Live & Session Tracks 2019-2021 in May 2022. The compilation featured Iggy Pop on a performance of "I Wanna Be Your Dog."

Las Nubes have toured the US and Mexico, performing on bills with acts including Sheer Mag, Shannon and The Clams, The Coathangers, Jens Lekman, Alice Bag, and others.

Las Nubes issued the Enredados / Drop In single via Thurston Moore's Ecstatic Peace Library label in December 2023 before returning with their second full-length album, Tormentas Malsanas in June 2024. The album was released through the Sweat Records Records, Spinda Records, and Godless America labels, and premiered on Under the Radar magazine. Radio support for the album included KCRW, WKDU, KDHX, WMBR, KRUI-FM, and FM4. Press support included Mondo Sonoro, Remezcla, Musos' Guide, Atwood Magazine, God Is In The TV, and The Post, among others.

In promotion of Tormentas Malsanas, Las Nubes guested on Damian Abraham's Turned Out A Punk podcast, and recorded a live session for KEXP, a station which had been supportive of the release. They also toured the East and West coasts in the Summer and Fall, respectively.

After the release of Tormentas Malsanas, Las Nubes placed on a number of end-of-year lists for KEXP, Grimy Goods, Merge Records, Monterrey 360, and others. "Pesada" reached no.1 in the Hype Machine "Popular Now" chart in January 2025.

== Other projects by Campos and Milgrim ==
Ale Campos is a film photographer, and the guitarist in Iggy Pop's live band. She was also a founding member of the groups Testökra and Wastelands. Campos is also a volunteer music instructor at the Miami Girls Rock Camp.

Emile Milgrim is the founder of the Other Electricities record label, and a co-founder of Miami Girls Rock Camp. She is also a sound-designer, and one-half of the Archival Feedback project. Milgrim is also the drummer for Mr. Entertainment & The Pookiesmackers, and previously drummed for Quarter Horses and Parker Posey Posse.

== Discography ==
=== Albums ===
- SMVT (Sweat Records Records, 2019)
- Tormentas Malsanas (Sweat Records Records / Godless America / Spinda Records, 2024)

=== EPs ===
- Matter That Soils or Blackens (Self-Released, 2014)
- Conveniently Broken (Self-Released, 2015)
- Some Things to Let Go (Self-Released, 2017)
- Drive Thru Debut (Wax Romantix / Cheap Miami Tapes, 2019)
- Split EP - with Palomino Blond (BUFU Records, 2020)

=== Singles ===
- QSW (Sweat Records Records, 2019)
- Hellbag (Sweat Records Records, 2019)
- QSW: Live At Marvin (Self-Released, 2021)
- Tararear: Live At Marvin (Self-Released, 2021)
- Enredados / Drop In (Ecstatic Peace Library, 2023)
- Would Be (Sweat Records Records / Spinda Records, 2024)
- Pesada (Sweat Records Records / Spinda Records, 2024)

=== Compilations ===
- The First Three EP's + Emotional Debris (Self-Released, 2019)
- LIVE NUBES: Live & Session Tracks 2019-2021 (Self-Released, 2022)

=== Compilation appearances ===
- Gator Ramen Vol.1: A Taste of Florida Indie & Garage Rock (Farmadelica Sound, 2020) - contributes "Can't Say"
- Comfort Monk: Purusuance, Vo.1 (Comfort Monk, 2021) - contributes "Retrograde"
