= Ecstatic Peace Library =

British publishing company

Ecstatic Peace Library is a book publishing imprint founded by Thurston Moore and Eva Prinz to release an exhibition catalogue by photographer Justine Kurland. The name is derived from Ecstatic Peace!, (also a music label run by Thurston Moore & Andrew Kesin), and an expression found in a passage from Tom Wolfe's book The Electric Kool-Aid Acid Test. The company publishes a range of photography and art-related books about the early Norwegian black metal scene, experimental jazz from the 1970s.

== Founders ==
Thurston Moore is a musician best known as one of the founding members of the band Sonic Youth and now performs with various ensembles including his own band, The Thurston Moore Group. Eva Prinz started her publishing career in New York City at Taschen America. She held positions as Editor of Fine Arts at Rizzoli International Publications and later Senior Editor at Abrams Books. Prinz guest edited artist Peter Halley's Index Magazine (April/May 2005) and participated in curating exhibitions in New York City, including 'Radical Living Papers' which was a survey of the underground press from 1960-75 at Gavin Brown's Passerby gallery space. Eva Prinz and Thurston Moore began working together on books at Rizzoli International Publications — their first book was on the subject of mixtapes entitled Mixtape: The Art of Cassette Culture and was published on the pop culture imprint Universe Books, a division of Rizzoli. Prinz and Moore collaborated on several books that focused on music for Rizzoli and Abrams and worked together for several years before founding their own imprint Ecstatic Peace Library in 2009.

== History ==
Ecstatic Peace Library published their first publication, Justine Kurland's This Train is Bound for Glory, in 2009. This was an exhibition catalogue for Kurland's show at Mitchell-Innes & Nash in New York.The publishing company has gone on to create artist books pertaining to music, from photography to monographs and further exhibition catalogues and continues to publish works inspired by music.

On 5 September 2018, Ecstatic Peace Library announced the creation of their record label Daydream Library Series, with its premiere album Sistahs by the London band Big Joanie. The release was accompanied by a limited edition fanzine, edited by Moore, Prinz and Big Joanie.

Subsequently, the label released Big Joanie's second full-length studio album, Back Home, in collaboration with the US legendary Riot Grrl label Kill Rock Stars. Following Big Joanie's success with Sistahs and Back Home, the black, feminist, punk band attracted accolades from the likes of The New Yorker, which described the 'politically vibrant' trio's album as having a 'contemporary sheen'.

In a continuation of the label's political infusion, Daydream Library Series released Miami grrl band Las Nubes' Enredados/ Drop-In, 7-inch with two singles, inspired by band members Ale Campos' compulsion to sing in Spanish, 'in an act of rebellion' against a fascist US Administration (2016-2020)..

Daydream Library Series also found a politically active music scene in co-founder Thurston Moore's birthplace of Miami, discovering 'Caribbean-Jazz Gaze' band Seafoam Walls. The label released their debut album XVI, which featured in Spin Magazine's 22 Artists to Watch in 2022 feature.

In 2024, the label released Devon Ross' first EP, Oxford Gardens, which immediately charted on Billboard's 'Tastemakers Albums' and received high acclaim from the likes of Spin Magazine.

== Notable Publications ==
- This Train is Bound for Glory by Justine Kurland (2011)
- You Should Have Heard Just What I Seen: The Music Photography by James Hamilton (2015)
- Stereo Sanctity: Lyrics and Poems by Thurston Moore (2015)
- The Death Archives: Mayhem 1984-94 by Jorn 'Necrobutcher' Stubberud (2016)
- Adrian Henri: I Want Everything to Happen! by Catherine Marcangeli (2019)
- Flutter Echo: Living Within Sound by David Toop (2019)
- Linger On: The Velvet Underground by Ignacio Julià (2023)
- Now Jazz Now: 100 Essential Free Jazz & Improvisation Recordings 1960-80 by Byron Coley, Thurston Moore and Mats Gustafson (2025)

== Daydream Library Series discography ==
- Sistahs by Big Joanie (30 November 2018)
- Angeltalk by Katherina Bornefeld (21 September 2019)
- Spirit Counsel by Thurston Moore (21 September 2019)
- "Three Graces" by Thurston Moore (8 November 2019)
- "Pollination" by Thurston Moore (8 November 2019)
- "Leave Me Alone" by Thurston Moore (8 November 2019)
- Trees Outside the Academy (Remastered) by Thurston Moore (24 July 2020)
- By the Fire by Thurston Moore (25 September 2020)
- "Hashish" by Thurston Moore (26 September 2020)
- Lux Perpetua by Xopher Davidson (5 November 2021)
- XVI by Seafoam Walls (12 November 2021)
- Back Home by Big Joanie (4 November 2022)
- Enredados/Drop In by Las Nubes (16 December 2023)
- Oxford Gardens by Devon Ross (16 February 2024)
- Flow Critical Lucidity by Thurston Moore (20 September 2024)
- Once Around by Schande (27 September 2024)
- Experience by Attawalpa (4 July 2025)
- Pin-Ups by Devon Ross (6 March 2026)
