= Trash Kit =

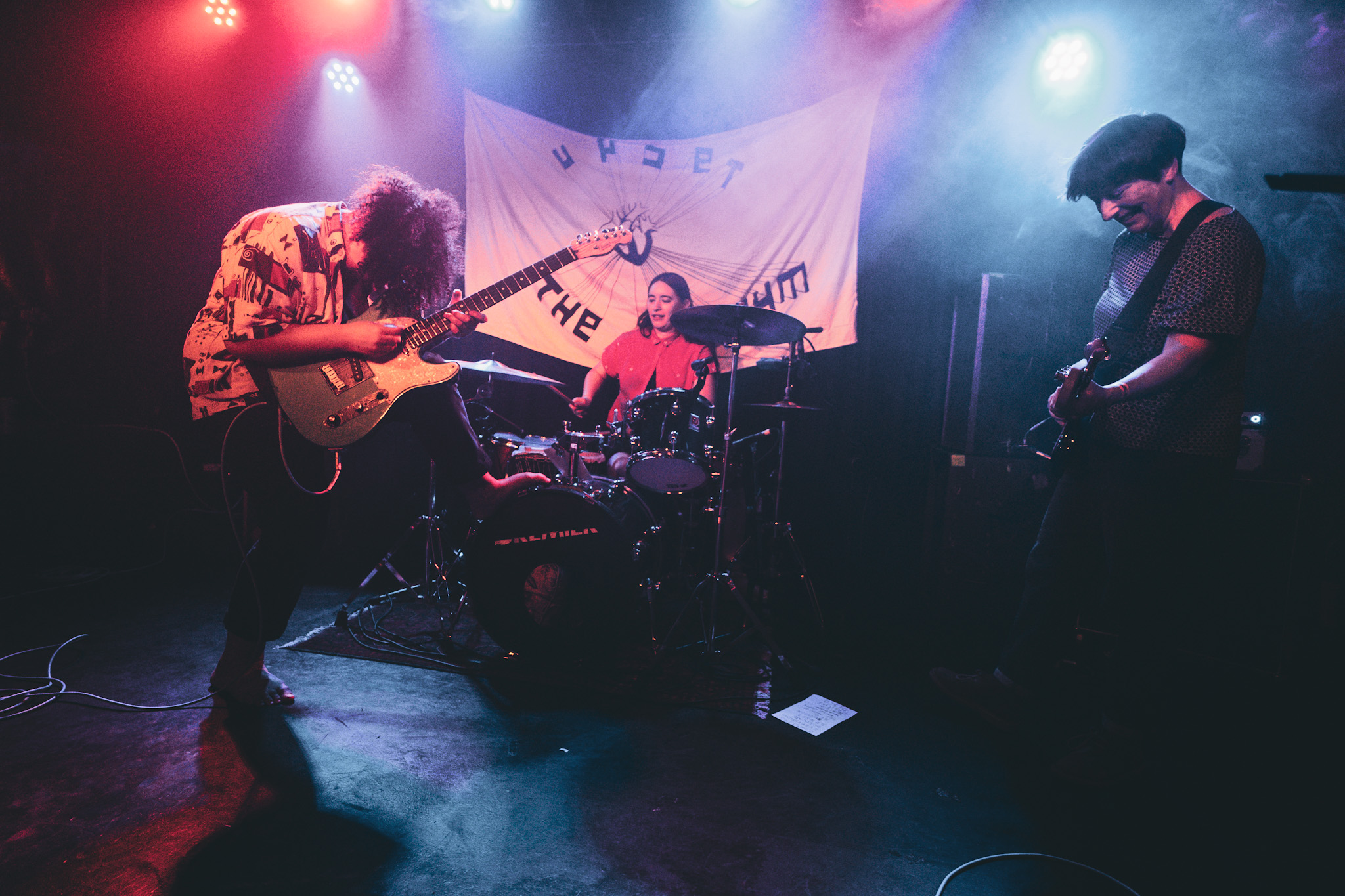
- Trash Kit at The Lexington, Islington in 2020

Background information
- Origin: London, England
- Genres: Post-punk, indie rock, experimental rock, Afrobeat, world music
- Years active: 2008–present
- Label: Upset The Rhythm
- Members: Ray Aggs; Rachel Horwood; Gill Partington
- Past members: Ros Murray

Trash Kit is a British post-punk trio formed in 2008 in London. Its members are Ray Aggs (guitar and vocals), Gill Partington (bass guitar), and Rachel Horwood (drums and vocals).

Original bassist Ros Murray was previously of the band Electrelane. Ray Aggs also plays in Sacred Paws and Shopping, and Rachel Horwood in Bamboo and Bas Jan (the latter also featuring Serafina Steer). Gill Partington and Rachel Horwood also played together in Halo Halo.

== History ==
Ray Aggs and Rachel Horwood met and became friends at university and had been in a couple of bands together prior to forming Trash Kit, inspired by post punk, African percussion, and street performers who drum on trash cans. They met Ros Murray at the Here shop in Bristol.

Upset The Rhythm asked them to record for their label immediately after seeing them play for the first time at the 'Yes Way' festival UTR had put on. They released a 7" single, and their first album for the label - entitled Trash Kit - both in 2010.

After their debut release the band's members spent time playing with other bands. Aggs with Golden Grrrls, Sacred Paws, and Shopping. Horwood with Bamboo and Halo Halo.

Their second album Confidence was released in 2014 again to critical acclaim. It featured the addition of Murray's former Electrelane bandmate Verity Susman playing free jazz-inspired saxophone.

In May 2017, Thurston Moore highlighted them as a band one should know about in an article on the NME's website.

Horwood's Halo Halo bandmate Gill Partington took over bass duties from Murray, and in May 2019 they announced their first album in 5 years, Horizon, would be released 5 July that year. The album featured saxophone played by Dan Leavers of The Comet is Coming.

== Musical style ==
Their music has been compared to UK punk and post punk acts like The Slits, the Raincoats, and the Au Pairs, as well as noting the West African highlife influence on Aggs' guitar lines. Trash Kit themselves listed early influences as New York no wave and avant-garde musicians Y Pants, Ikue Mori of DNA, and Marnie Stern.

== Discography ==
=== Albums ===
- Trash Kit - Upset The Rhythm, 12" LP, CD, MP3 (2010)
- Confidence - Upset The Rhythm, 12" LP, CD, MP3 (2014)
- Horizon - Upset The Rhythm, 12" LP, CD, MP3 (2019)

=== Singles ===
- Teenagers / How Do You Do? - Upset The Rhythm, 7" single, MP3 (2010)

=== Split releases ===
- Split with Woolf - Mïlk Records, 7" single, MP3 (2010)
