= GHUM =

Post punk band

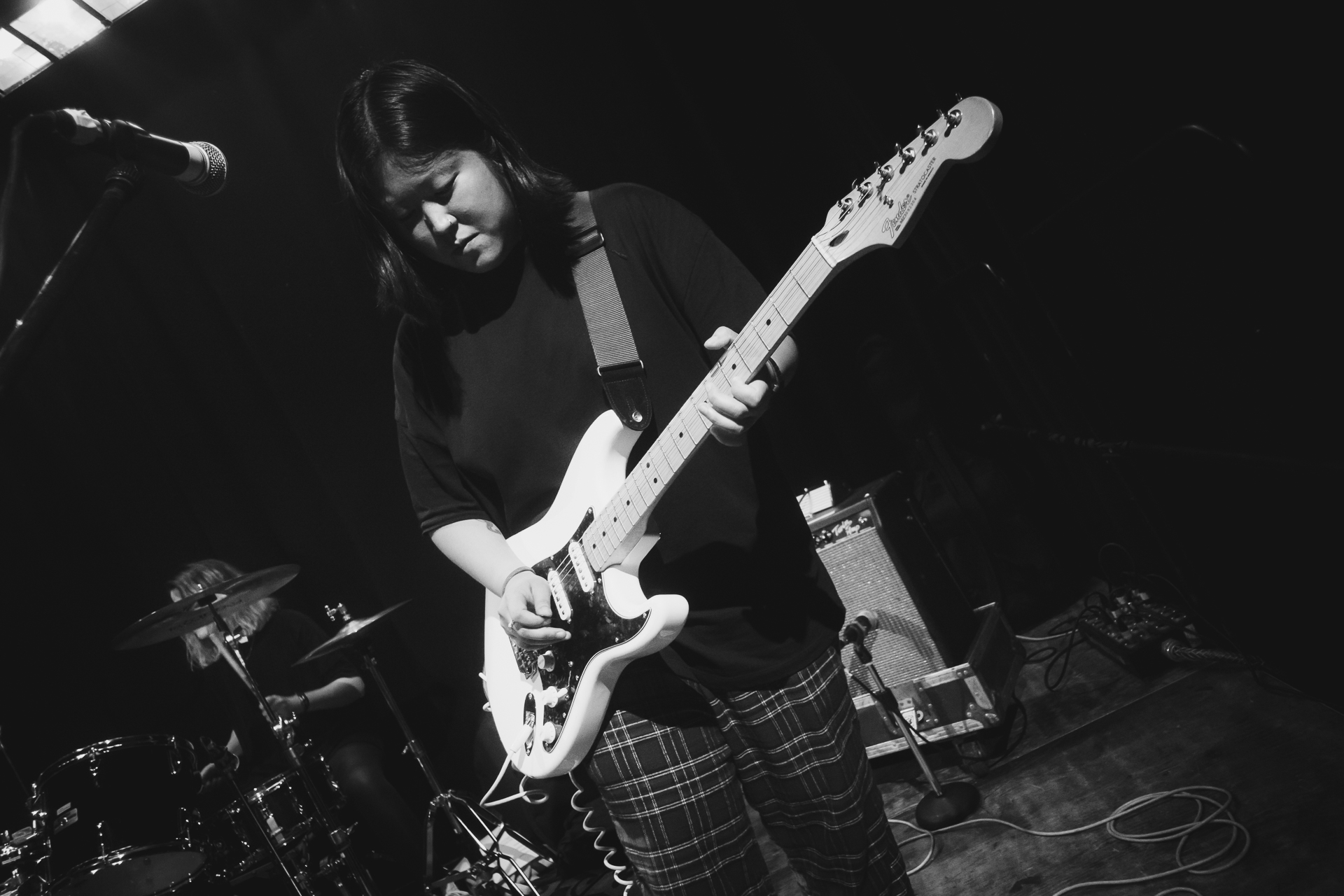
- GHUM performing in 2018. Khor (front) and Ann (bottom left)

Background information
- Origin: London, England
- Genres: Post punk; gothic rock
- Years active: 2016 — present
- Labels: Everything Sucks Music
- Members: Laura Guerrero Lora; Marina MJ; Jojo Khor
- Past members: Vicki Ann
- Website: https://ghum.bandcamp.com

GHUM are a London-based post punk band, formed in 2016. They released their debut album, Bitter, in June 2022.

== History ==
GHUM currently consists of Laura Guerrero Lora (vocals), Marina MJ (bass), and Jojo Khor (guitar). Drummer Vicki Ann departed the band in January 2023 after completing a final tour with Big Joanie. They met after Marina placed an advertisement on Gumtree seeking bandmates.

They released their first EP, Ghum in 2017; their second, The Coldest Fire was released in 2019, backed with a UK tour in July 2019. The EP came to national media attention, with the band doing a BBC Introducing session and lead track "Saturn" being playlisted by BBC Radio 6 Music. The band's follow-up single "California", released January 2020, was debuted on the Steve Lamacq show on BBC Radio 6 Music and featured on his 6 Music Recommends playlist. The song was named one of the '20 best rock songs right now' by The Fader.

Bands GHUM have played with include Dream Wife and L.A. Witch. After seeing them, Alice Go of Dream Wife contributed a remix of their 2018 single "I'm the Storm".

In March 2022 GHUM released lead new single "Some People", from their debut album Bitter, which was released on June 17, 2022. "Some People" was followed by "Bitter" in May 2022 and title track "Bad Brain" in June 2022. The album was described by Line of Best Fit as "a taut nine song masterclass". The band in June 2022 in Europe supporting Soft Kill and Choir Boy.

Later in 2022 saw GHUM be announced as tour support for Big Joanie's UK tour in 2023., and the announcement of their first North American appearances in March 2023: at South By Southwest and a festival in New York.

== Discography ==
=== Albums ===
- Bitter - Everything Sucks, 12" LP, CD, Cassette, MP3 (2022)

=== Extended plays ===
- Ghum - Self released, MP3 (2017)
- The Coldest Fire - Everything Sucks, 12" EP, MP3 (2019)

=== Singles ===
- "I'm the Storm" / "Undone"- Everything Sucks, Cassette, MP3 (2018)
- "California"- Everything Sucks, MP3 (2020)
- "Some People" - Everything Sucks, MP3 (2022)
- "Bitter" - Everything Sucks, MP3 (2022)
- "Bad Brain" - Everything Sucks, MP3 (2022)
