= Electrelane =

English indie rock band

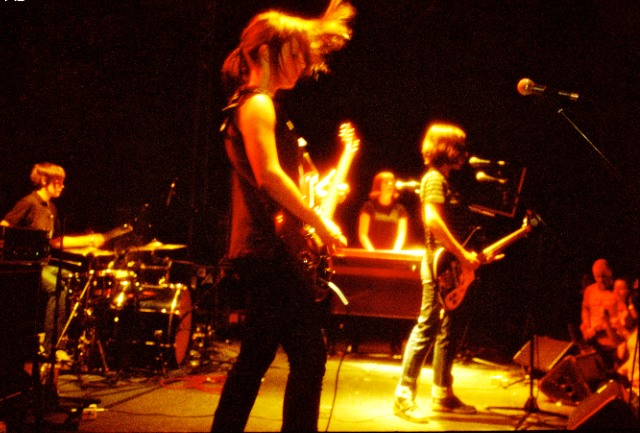
- Electrelane performing at the Pavilion Theatre in Brighton in December 2007

Background information
- Origin: Brighton, East Sussex, England
- Genres: Indie rock, post-rock, post-punk revival, indie pop, experimental rock
- Years active: 1998–2007, 2011–2012 (on hiatus)
- Labels: Too Pure, Beggars Banquet
- Members: Mia Clarke; Emma Gaze; Ros Murray; Verity Susman
- Past members: Tracy Houdek; Debbie Ball; Rupert Noble; Rachel Dalley
- Website: www.electrelane.com

Electrelane is an English indie rock band, formed in Brighton in 1998 by Verity Susman and Emma Gaze. The band consists of Susman, Gaze, Mia Clarke, and Ros Murray. Their music draws from a wide range of influences including Neu!, Stereolab, Sonic Youth, and the Velvet Underground. When playing live, the band has a reputation for a focused show that minimizes audience interaction and rarely included more than one encore.

Although the band has strong feminist and political views in their personal lives, they generally prefer to not communicate that directly to their fans or through their music; one exception is their inclusion of the protest song "The Partisan," - a cover - which they began playing while on tour in the United States during the months preceding the 2004 Presidential election.

== History ==
=== Early years (1998–2000) ===
The band recorded their first single, "Film Music," and released it in January 2000 on the Skint Records offshoot label Indenial. They released another single ("Le Song") with Fierce Panda before creating their own label, Let's Rock!, with distribution by 3MV. The first two singles they released were "Gabriel" and "Blue Straggler" and in fall of 2000 they began work on their debut album. During this period, they had a number of personnel changes. The original bassist was Tracy Houdek, who left the band due to a pregnancy. She was briefly replaced by Rupert Noble until Rachel Dalley signed on. Original guitarist Debbie Ball was replaced by Mia Clarke.

=== Rock It to the Moon (2000–2003) ===
Their debut album, Rock It to the Moon, was released in April 2001 through Mr. Lady Records. Although Electrelane started off as a traditional band with vocals, this album was mostly instrumental. Verity Susman explained, "Way way back, when we first started, we always had a lot of singing. But it never worked that well. When we did instrumental it was always more interesting. More completely we felt like we were doing something good, while the songs with the singing ended up quite bog-standard, boring, not very interesting." NME rated the album an 8 out of 10, saying Rock It to the Moon was "just the way a debut album should be... utterly focused [and] stripped of all extraneous flab."

=== The Power Out (2003–2004) ===
Electrelane brought in Steve Albini to record their second album, The Power Out, while production was still handled by the band. The result was an album that added more vocals and structure to the songs, giving them almost pop-like vibes. It was released on Too Pure in February 2004. The album was widely recognised and praised as critics appreciated the added complexity and vocals on their new work.

Electrelane had not only added vocals to the work, but had transcended conventional expectations by employing a number of techniques. Of the nine songs with vocals, three of them were done in different languages. The album opener "Gone Under Sea" is sung completely in French. The third song, "The Valleys," featuring the vocals of the ensemble Chicago a cappella, had in part sections from Siegfried Sassoon's "A Letter Home." On "Oh Sombra!" the Spanish lyrics are a sonnet by 16th century Catalan poet Juan Boscán Almogáver. On "This Deed" the lyrics are a single line, in German, from Friedrich Nietzsche's Die fröhliche Wissenschaft followed by the exclamation "Hände hoch!" (or "Hands up!"). These touches, as one review put it, "managed to be unique without being a radical departure."

Midway through 2004, Rachel Dalley left the group and was replaced by Ros Murray, an old friend of the group.

=== Axes (2004–2006) ===
For their follow up, the mostly instrumental Axes, Electrelane once again returned to Steve Albini's studio in Chicago. In the first recording session for Axes, the band played through the entire album in one take. This reflected the band's desire to have listeners of the album experience the band's live show. Emma Gaze explained the album was recorded "the way we rehearse and practise: we all stand in a circle and it is very relaxed. Our previous recording experiences have been with the bass in one room, the drums in a different room, the two guitarists in a different room and then the vocals are done afterwards. Obviously it works like that because that is how most bands do it. But we just wanted it to sound more live; there is a different kind of energy that comes from playing in the same room." Verity Susman said that "We see the record as a continuous piece of music, not a collection of songs. It also reflects the way we improvise, moving from one idea to the next without a clear break. It's also how we play live." The album was released on 9 May 2005 to mixed, but generally positive, reviews.

As with The Power Out, Electrelane supported Axes with a global tour. By now they had toured in the UK, the United States, Canada, France, Germany, the Netherlands, Italy, Switzerland, Sweden, Denmark, Norway, Ireland, Spain, Greece, Turkey, Japan and Australia. They both headlined their own tours and supported tours for the Ex and Le Tigre among others; they had also appeared at festivals such as South by Southwest and the ATP Festival.

=== No Shouts, No Calls and indefinite hiatus (2006–2007) ===
No Shouts, No Calls is Electrelane's fourth studio album, and their first which was entirely digitally recorded and mixed. The group began writing material in Berlin's Planet Roc Studio in the summer of 2006, at the height of the World Cup. During that period, the band became fans of the sport, going so far as to rearrange their recording schedules around the event and including a sample of a match between Hertha BSC and FC Moskva in the song "Five" on their new album.

In August, Electrelane released Singles, B-Sides & Live, a rarities collection that included a number of live performances as well as original versions of tracks from their debut album. In September and October, they were in Benton Harbor recording and mixing their album. In November, the band announced on their official website that they had finished recording and had titled their album No Shouts, No Calls. The album was released in on 23 April 2007 in Japan, 3 May 2007 in the US and 30 April 2007 elsewhere. The first single, titled "To the East," was released on 12 March 2007. The album received generally positive reviews, with Heather Phares of AllMusic calling some songs "among the band's finest work"; detractors included Leonie Cooper of the Guardian, who mentioned the band had a "penchant for turning every tune [into] a proggy wig-out." James Reed of the Boston Globe picked the album as one of the best of 2007. In May and June 2007 the band toured the United States with Tender Forever and opened for Arcade Fire on several of their shows. For the rest of the summer, they played the Fuji Rock Festival in Japan as well as various festivals in Europe, including La Route du Rock, Summercase, Montreux Jazz Festival and Festival Paredes de Coura.

In early November 2007, Electrelane posted a message on their website, explaining that they would be on an indefinite hiatus. Their "last" show "for the foreseeable future" was on 1 December 2007 in Brighton, England. On 14 December, the band organised a benefit for the Anti-Trafficking Alliance at the Barfly in London. They did not perform, choosing to DJ instead.

=== Brief reformation (2011–2012) ===
In February 2011, Electrelane announced they would play several festivals, including Field Day in London. During the spring, the band announced they would play The Big Chill festival held on the grounds of Eastnor Castle. They toured Australia in early 2012 as well. At the time, they announced no plans for new material or further tours.

=== New music announcement (2021) ===
The band announced in November 2021 that they are working together on their first new music since No Shouts, No Calls in 2007 and that "playing together again feels really, really good."

Verity Susman has released two film scores and a proper album as Memorials, a new project with Wire's Matthew Simms, since 2022.

== Lineup ==
Current members

- Verity Susman – lead vocals, keyboards, guitar, organ, saxophone, clarinet (1998-present)
- Emma Gaze – drums, artwork (1998-present)
- Mia Clarke – guitar, backing vocals (2000-present)
- Ros Murray – bass guitar, backing vocals (2005-present)

Past members

- Tracey Houdek – bass guitar (1998-99)
- Debbie Ball – guitar, vocals (1998-2000)
- Rupert Noble – bass guitar (1999)
- Rachel Dalley – bass guitar (1999-2004)

== Discography ==
Studio albums

- 2001: Rock It to the Moon
- 2004: The Power Out
- 2005: Axes
- 2007: No Shouts, No Calls

Singles and EPs

- 2000: Film Music
- 2000: Le Song
- 2000: Gabriel
- 2001: Blue Straggler
- 2002: I Want to Be President EP
- 2003: On Parade
- 2004: This Deed
- 2005: Two For Joy
- 2007: To the East
- 2007: In Berlin

Compilations

- 2006: Singles, B-Sides & Live
