= Power Lunches =

Music venue in London, England

Coordinates: 51.5425°N 0.0758°W

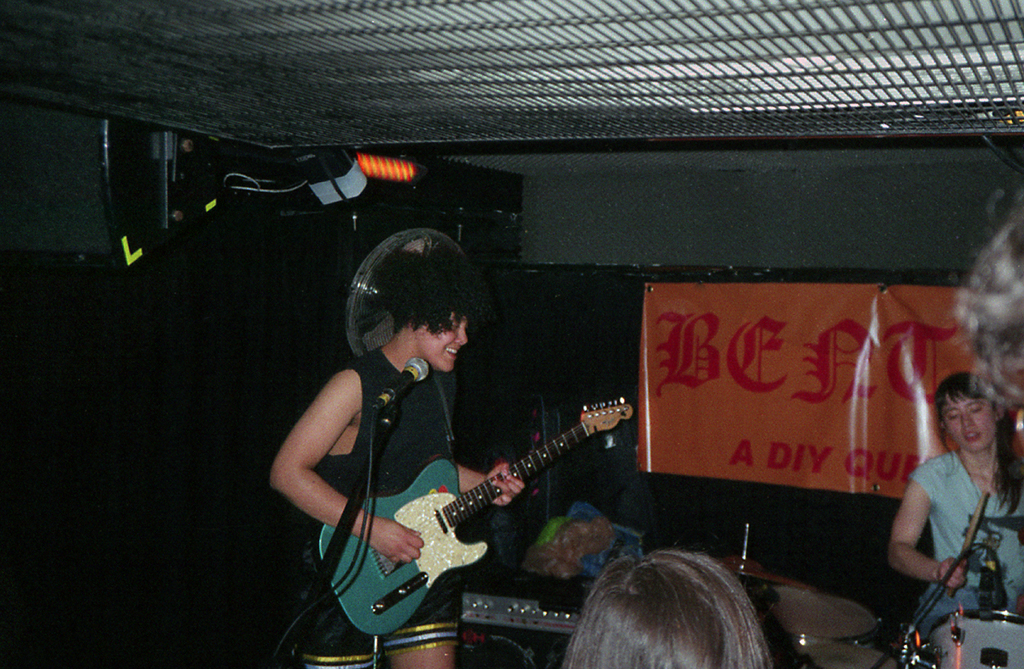
- Trash Kit at Power Lunches
- Interactive map of Power Lunches
- Location: 446 Kingsland Road, Dalston; London, E8; United Kingdom
- Capacity: 150

Construction
- Opened: July 2011
- Closed: December 2015

Power Lunches Arts Café was a music venue, rehearsal space, and creative hub located on Kingsland Road in Dalston, a district of the London Borough of Hackney.

== History ==
The café opened in 2011 and closed in 2015. It started out with gigs planned to be only at weekends, but later became a prominent feature of Hackney's DIY music scene with gigs most nights every week. Though originally genuinely also a café, it eventually stopped serving food.

The café hosted performances in its basement, the absolute maximum capacity of both floors was 150. These were most often concerts by local bands, but also saw acts from elsewhere in the UK, as well as further afield.

Staff of the venue hosted a radio show showcasing the type of music made by bands to appear there on NTS Radio between 2012 and 2015.
