= Sacred Paws =

Scottish rock band

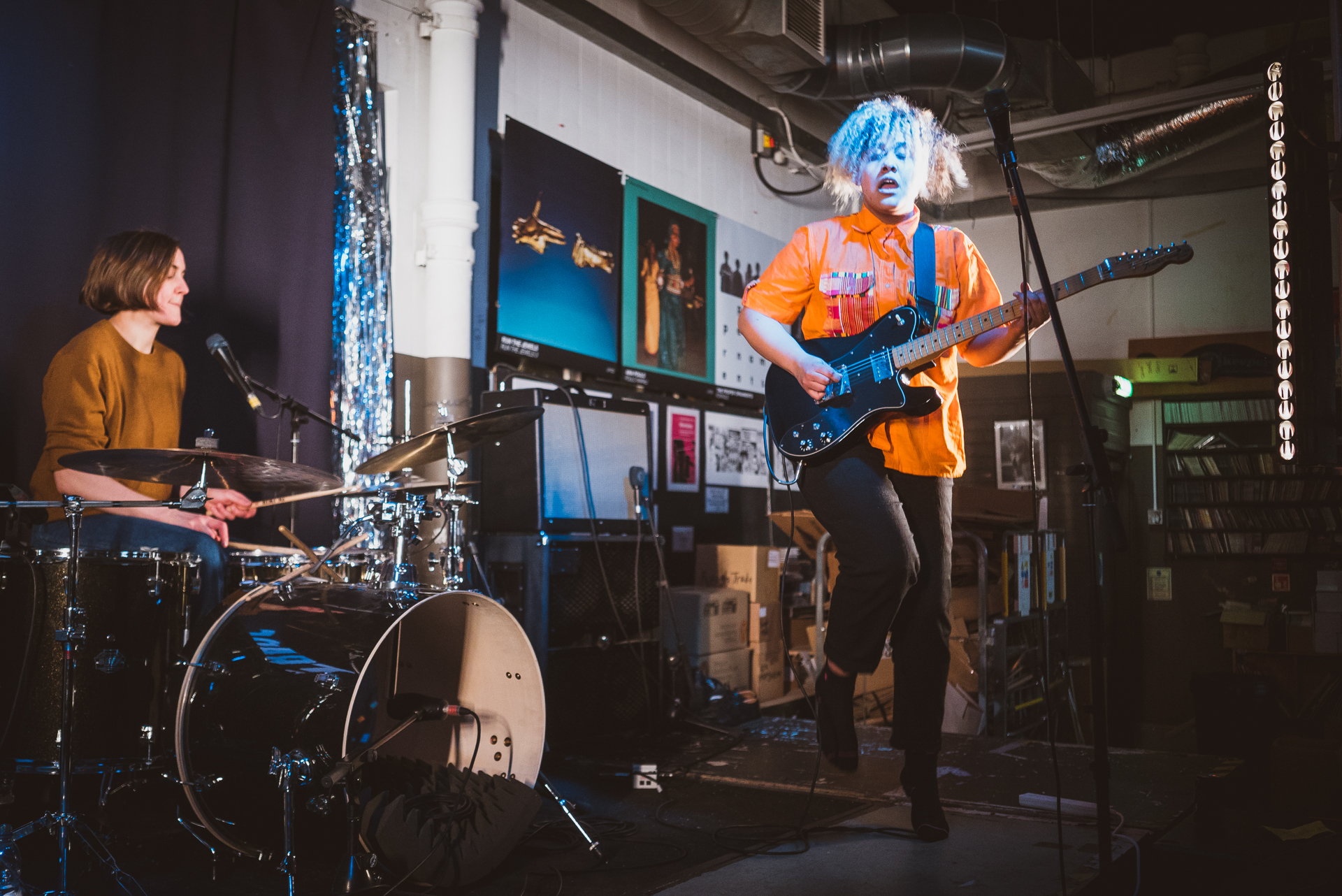
- Sacred Paws at Rough Trade East in 2017

Background information
- Origin: Glasgow, Scotland
- Genres: Post-punk, indie pop, Afrobeat
- Years active: 2013–present
- Labels: Rock Action, Merge
- Spinoff of: Golden Grrrls
- Members: Ray Aggs; Eilidh Rodgers

Sacred Paws is a Scottish indie-pop band comprising Ray Aggs (guitar, bass, vocals) and Eilidh Rodgers (drums, vocals). The two met as members of the band Golden Grrrls. Their debut album Strike a Match won the 2017 Scottish Album of the Year Award.

== History ==
Sacred Paws were born from the ashes of Ray Aggs' (vocals, guitar) and Eilidh Rodgers' (vocals, drums) previous indie-pop group Golden Grrrls. Despite Aggs living in London and Rodgers in Glasgow, they set about recording their debut EP after signing to the Mogwai-owned label Rock Action. They released a 6-track EP, Six Songs, in 2015, followed by a single, "Everyday", in 2016.

The band then embarked on a UK tour in support of the record, during which they played alongside acts like Mogwai, Veronica Falls, Tuff Love, and Future Islands. In the same year they also performed a BBC 6 Music session for DJ Marc Riley, and appeared at Glasgow's Celtic Connections festival.

Aggs continued to play in both Shopping and Trash Kit, but in spite of this, they and Rodgers were dedicated enough to find the time to record Sacred Paws' debut LP. In 2016, they issued two singles in advance of the album's release, "Everyday" and "Rest".

Their first full-length album Strike a Match (released 27 January 2017) combined an Afrobeat sound influenced by Fela Kuti with post-punk and indie resembling the likes of Delta 5. It was produced by Tony Doogan and released on Rock Action, record label of the Scottish band Mogwai. It was recorded at Mogwai's Castle of Doom studio and mastered at Abbey Road Studios. It scored 81/100 on Metacritic based on 7 reviews. Pitchfork scored it 7.7/10. MusicOHM scored it 4/5 stars, calling it "hugely satisfying", "ballsy and defiant".

On 29 January 2019 they shared a new track, "Brush Your Hair", with a new album expected to follow. On 28 February, during a BBC 6 Music session for Marc Riley, they played "Brush Your Hair", "The Conversation" and "Strike a Match". On 20 March 2019 the band announced their next album, Run Around the Sun, would be released on 31 May, as well as sharing the studio recording of new single "The Conversation".

In November 2024, the band released their first new music in five years, the single "Another Day".

== Discography ==
=== Albums ===
- Strike a Match (2017)
- Run Around the Sun (2019)
- Jump Into Life (2025)

=== EPs ===
- Six Songs – Rock Action, 12" EP, MP3 (2015)

=== Singles ===
- "Everyday" – Rock Action, 7", MP3 (2015)
- "Brush Your Hair" – Rock Action (UK/EU) / Merge (US), MP3 (2019)
- "The Conversation" – Rock Action (UK/EU) / Merge (US), MP3 (2019)
- "Another Day" - Rock Action (UK/EU) / Merge (US) (2024)
