= Chicago a cappella =

Organization

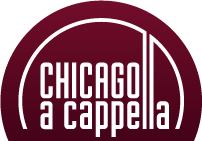
- Formation: 1993; 33 years ago
- Founder: Jonathan Miller
- Type: non-profit organization
- Purpose: Chicago a cappella advances the art and appreciation of ensemble singing.
- Headquarters: Chicago, Illinois, U.S.
- Artistic Director: John William Trotter
- Executive Director: Matthew Greenberg
- Website: http://www.chicagoacappella.org/

Chicago a cappella is an American professional vocal ensemble founded in 1993 by Jonathan Miller.

== History ==
The artistic director, Jonathan Miller, founded the ensemble in 1993 by performing as a low bass and directing rehearsals for the group's first 14 seasons. One of the founding ensemble members, Matthew Greenberg, joined the administrative staff in 1995 and presently serves as the organization's Executive Director. In 2007, Patrick Sinozich became the ensembles first music director after being appointed by Miller. In 2008, Miller was awarded the Louis Botto Award for Innovative Action and Entrepreneurial Zeal from Chorus America and was recognized for turning Chicago a cappella into a professional vocal ensemble.

Jonathan Miller retired from his role in 2020, and John William Trotter was named Artistic Director. Trotter established Chicago a cappella's HerVoice Emerging Women's Composer Competition in 2021, with mentor composers Stacy Garrop, Zanaida Robles, and Chen Yi. The program has mentored over 200 women composers, and resulted in 18 public performances of new works by women composers as of 2026 by Chicago a cappella and partner organizations Kansas City Chorale, Santa Fe Desert Chorale, and Vancouver Youth Choir.

The organization's audiences have actively grown since the ensembles formation and an ensemble of about ten singers typically perform in a wide array of concert programs each year in Chicago, Evanston, Naperville, and Oak Park, IL. The ensemble has performed musical works from their world, national, and local premiere. Chicago a cappella has presented new music from composers such as Joseph Jennings, Chen Yi, Stacy Garrop, Rollo Dilworth, Tania León, and Ezequiel Viñao. Chicago a cappella has performed more than 350 concerts and assembled over 200 performances through its Chicago-based sequence. When touring, the ensemble has performed in 13 different states throughout the United States and Mexico. The group has been played regularly on WFMT radio and through broadcasts spread by American Public Media, including the award-winning radio show Performance Today. The ensemble has made nine CD recordings of music extending from Renaissance masses to modern-day music. Currently, the organization's administrative offices are located in the Ravenswood neighborhood in Chicago.

== Discography ==
- Palestrina: Music for the Christmas Season (1996)
- Mathurin Forestier:Missa Baises moy; Missa L'homme armé (1999)
- Go Down Moses: Tracing the Roots of the African-American Spiritual (2001)
- Holidays a cappella Live (2003)
- Eclectric (2005)
- Shall I Compare Thee?: Choral Songs on Shakespeare Texts (2005)
- Christmas a cappella: Songs From Around the World (2008)
- Days of Awe and Rejoicing: Radiant Gems of Jewish Music (2011)
- Bound for Glory: New Settings of African-American Spirituals (2014)
- Global Transcendence: Sacred World Harmony and Chant (2014)
- Miracle of Miracles: Music for Hanukkah (2023)
