= Mia Clarke =

British guitarist and backing vocalist (born 1983)

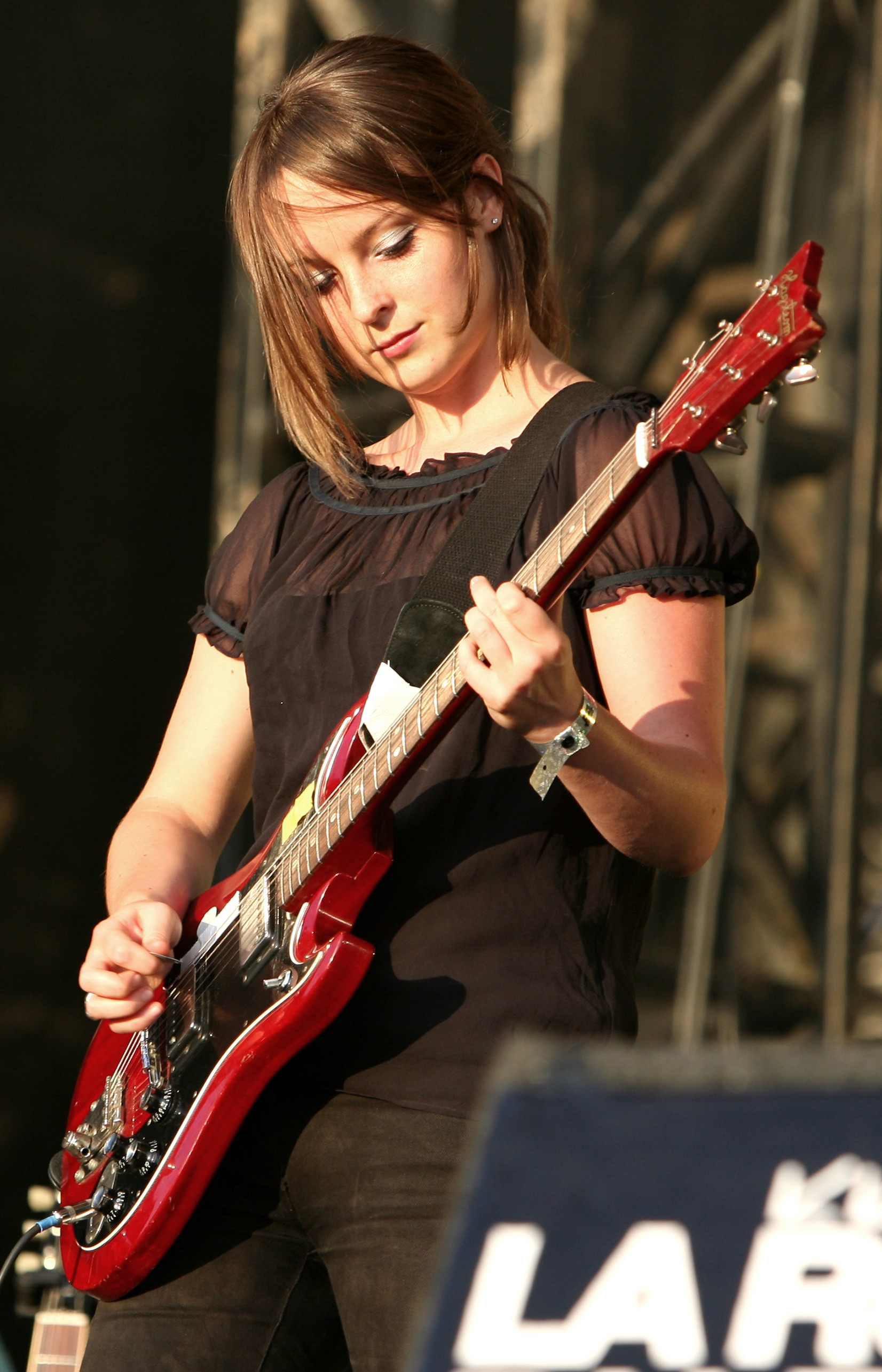
- Clarke at Route du Rock in 2007

Background information
- Born: Mia Lauren Clarke; 20 March 1983 (age 43); Brighton, East Sussex, England
- Genres: Alternative rock
- Occupations: Guitarist, writer
- Instruments: Guitar, vocals
- Years active: 2000–present
- Formerly of: Electrelane

Mia Lauren Clarke (born 20 March 1983) is an English guitarist from the alternative rock band Electrelane and an entrepreneur. She was born in Brighton, England and following a short period living in the Czech Republic moved to Chicago, United States in 2008

She formed a new band, Follows, in 2008 in Chicago with members of Russian Circles, Bloodiest, and Atombombpocketknife. Clarke has collaborated with Canadian hip hop artist Buck 65, contributing guitar to his Dirtbike 3/3 project.

In April 2008, Clarke flew to Amsterdam to record a guitar improvisation with Andy Moor of The Ex. Their collaboration "Guitargument" was released digitally by File Thirteen Records on 17 February 2009 and as a CD edition by hellosQuare recordings in late 2010.

She is also a freelance writer and has written about music for publications including The Wire, The Guardian, and Pitchfork Media. From 2009 to 2013, Clarke wrote a column on Chicago's classical music scene for Time Out Chicago. She then established a career as a copywriter and creative strategist.

In 2019, she co-founded a women's wellbeing brand, Nyssa, which she sold and exited in 2023.
