= Chew Disco =

British art and cultural activism project

Chew Disco was a queer feminist art and cultural activism project founded in Liverpool, England, in 2009 by Emma Obong and Khalil West. Initially a series of club nights and house parties, it was known for its DIY ethos and aesthetics, the diversity of its performers and programmes, and political advocacy. Owing to the sexual flexibility and playfulness of its atmosphere, "large-scale art installations and live performance art", and emphasis on dancing, its live events and parties garnered comparisons to The Factory and DUMBA. Bringing together both "queer icons" and a range of underground artists to raise money for grassroots initiatives for women, girls, and sexual minorities worldwide, the flagship party expanded into multiple forms and sites of live performance, curatorial work, exhibition, clubbing, and community activism, cementing its legacy "as one of Britain's most important queer projects".

== History ==
External videos
- Interview with Khalil West for Tate Liverpool's ‘’You Are Here - A Pop-Up Museum of LGBT+ History’’, YouTube video
- Vaginal Davis says hello to Liverpool, YouTube video

West and Obong met shortly after's West's relocation from New Jersey to Liverpool in 2006. In early 2009, the duo conceived Chew Disco as an alternative to both the city's gay quarter and its DIY and punk music scenes, directing their explicit focus to political partying, sexual and racial inclusivity, and musical diversity.

The club night was launched on 7 August 2009. From 2009 to 2016, the live event hosted performances by more than 40 bands, musicians, DJs, and multidisciplinary artists, including Vaginal Davis, Trash Kit, Mykki Blanco, Cakes da Killa, Shopping, Joey Fourr, MR TC, Queer'd Science, and Optimo Music acts Golden Teacher and Shift Work. Funds raised through many of the events were donated to various LGBTQ+ and women's and girl's rights organisations, including Iraqi LGBT, the Iranian and Kurdish Women's Rights Organization (IKWRO), Icebreakers Uganda (part of Sexual Minorities Uganda), International Railroad for Queer Refugees, Panzi Hospital, and Coming Out (Russia). By 2011, the project had begun to collaborate as stage and film curators with more formal arts institutions, collectives and festivals, including Islington Mill, Foundation for Art and Creative Technology (FACT), Cheryl, Homotopia, Abandon Normal Devices, and Sounds From The Other City.

The party has been described as the “best alternative night in town” and was heavily influenced by Obong's Black feminist politics, West's formative years in the queer and punk club spaces of New Jersey and New York City's East Village, as well as their shared interests in hip hop, queercore, house, and post-punk music, scenes and movements. The project's general design aesthetic drew equally heavily on American b-movies, underground or “cult” cinema, and vintage pulp paperbacks, and elements of its flagship events included free mix tapes, go-go dance performances (often incorporating fake blood and found objects), and “secret” afterparties.

Parties, Live Events and Screenings

=== 2016 ===
- Chew Disco & Trash-O-Rama present: The Birth Marks, Mother, Joey Fourr, Queer'd Science, Happy Meals, and Mr TC
  Sounds From The Other City, Salford, 1 May 2016

=== 2015 ===
- Chew Disco film series for Homotopia
  FACT, Liverpool, Nov 2015
  - Portrait of Jason (dir. Shirley Clarke, 1967)
  - Pay It No Mind: The Life and Times of Marsha P. Johnson (dir. Michael Kasino, 2012)
  - Out in the Night (dir. blair dorosh-walther, 2014)
  - The Queen (dir. Frank Simon, 1968)
- Chew Disco presents: Cakes da Killa, with Apostille
  Soup Kitchen, Manchester, 16 Jul 2015
- Chew Disco presents: Golden Teacher, Galaxians, and Game_Program
  The Kazimier, Liverpool, 21 May 2015
- Chew Disco Vol. 13: Shift Work, Apostille, and Happy Meals
  The Kazimier, Liverpool, 28 Mar 2015

=== 2014 ===
- Chew Disco presents: Los Cripis, with Dog Legs, Good Grief, Dream Soda
  The Shipping Forecast, Liverpool, 10 Jul 2014
- Chew Disco & Comfortable On A Tightrope present: Juffage, Picastro, Islaja, Yong Yong, Shopping, and Golden Teacher
  Sounds From The Other City, Salford, 4 May 2014

=== 2013 ===
- Chew Disco Vol. 12: Vaginal Davis, Shopping, and ILL
  The Kazimier, Liverpool, and John Waters afterparty at Homotopia, 8 Nov 2013
- Chew Disco, Off With Their Heads & Murkage present: Mykki Blanco
  Islington Mill, Salford, 16 May 2013
- Chew Disco Vol. 11: Trash Kit, Queer'd Science, and Sex Hands
  The Kazimier, Liverpool, 2 Feb 2013

=== 2012 ===
- Chew Disco presents: Georgia Asphalt and Cuss Words, at Royal Rukus (Cheryl/Off With Their Heads)
  Islington Mill, Salford, 3 Jun 2012

=== 2011 ===
- Chew Disco & Abandon Normal Devices present: Bruce La Bruce's L.A. Zombie, with Severin and Bad Taste Barbies
  Wolstenholme Creative Space, Liverpool, 30 Sep 2011
- Chew Disco and Queerfest present: Bent Frames
  FACT, Liverpool, May – Jun 2011
  - Mala Noche (dir. Gus Van Sant, 1986)
  - The Watermelon Woman (dir. Cheryl Dunye, 1996)
  - Hustler White (dir. Rick Castro, Bruce La Bruce, 1996)
  - By Hook or By Crook (dir. Harry Dodge, Silas Howard, 2001)
- Chew Disco Vol. 10: Covergirl Georgia Asphalt, and Dirtblonde
  The Kazimier, Liverpool, 7 May 2011
- Chew Disco Vol. 9: Punk Bunny, Black Barbie, and Penelope Edmund
  The Shipping Forecast, Liverpool, 29 Jan 2011

=== 2010 ===
- Chew Disco Vol. 8: Maria & The Gay, Barbieshop, Organ Freeman, and Apple Cannon
  The Shipping Forecast, Liverpool, 29 Oct 2010
- Chew Disco Vol. 7: Sister Mantos, Covergirl, We Came Out Like Tigers, Pifco, Matron, and Trevy Trevwa
  The Shipping Forecast, Liverpool, 10 Sep 2010; and The Pilgrim, Liverpool, 11 Sep 2010
- Chew Disco Vol. 6: Will and Rick, Beards, My Elastic Eye, and Millie Dollar
  Puzzle Bar, Liverpool, 7 Aug 2010
- Chew Disco Vol. 5: Death of the Elephant, Lovecraft, and El Toro!
  The Shipping Forecast, Liverpool, 11 Jun 2010
- Chew Disco Vol. 4: Dirtblonde and The Arch Nazards
  Korova Bar, Liverpool, 16 Apr 2010
- Chew Disco Vol. 3: Pifco, Peepholes, and Seawitches
  Korova Bar, Liverpool, 19 Mar 2010

=== 2009 ===
- Chew Disco Vol. 2: Trash Kit, Ste McCabe, Vile Vile Creatures, and Peepholes
  The Masque, Liverpool, 14 Nov 2009
- Chew Disco Vol. 1: Ste McCabe, Vile Vile Creatures, and Husbands
  The Magnet, Liverpool, 9 Aug 2009

Main, Support and Guest DJ Sets

=== 2019 ===
- Bollox Queer Pride (Guest DJ)
  The Deaf Institute, Manchester, 25 Aug 2019
- Gross Indecency presents: Christeene (Guest DJs)
  The White Hotel, Manchester, 10 Aug 2019

=== 2018 ===
- Bent Fest: Chew Disco x Qween of Swords (Main DJs)
  DIY Space for London, London, 27 May 2018

=== 2017 ===
- Bollox Queer Pride (Guest DJs)
  The Deaf Institute, Manchester, 25 Aug 2017
- Berries: Hip Hop & Beyond (Guest DJs)
  OHM, Berlin, 30 Jun 2017
- Bollox: ‘Rebel Dykes’ Takeover, with Pretty in Pink (Guest DJs)
  The Deaf Institute, Manchester, 16 Apr 2017
- Eat Me / Preach! (Guest DJ)
  Invisible Wind Factory, Liverpool, 5 May 2017
- No More Valentines #2 (Guest DJ)
  The Chameleon, Nottingham, 11 Feb 2017

=== 2016 ===
- Berries: Hip Hop & Beyond (Guest DJs)
  OHM, Berlin, 9 Dec 2016
- Berries: Hip Hop & Beyond (Guest DJs)
  OHM, Berlin, 18 Mar 2016
- Berries: Hip Hop & Beyond (Guest DJs)
  SchwuZ, Berlin, 12 Feb 2016

=== 2015 ===
- The Storming (Cornerhouse Closing Party) (Guest DJ)
  Cornerhouse, Manchester, 4 Apr 2015
- Release Yourself VI, featuring Shift Work (Support DJs)
  Wharf Cambers, Leeds, 2 Feb 2015

=== 2014 ===
- Queen of the Track presents ‘Witch B!tch’ (Guest DJs)
  24 Kitchen St, Liverpool, 30 Oct 2014
- Liverpool Biennial and Islington Mill present: Christeene (Main DJs)
  The Black-E, Liverpool, 6 Jul 2014
- CHERYL7, featuring Cheryl (artist collective), Chew Disco, Guts For Garters, Pumping Iron, and DJ Nick (Guest DJs)
  Islington Mill, Salford, 28 Jun 2014
- Bollox x Chew Disco (Guest DJs)
  Alter Ego, Manchester, 20 Sep 2013
- Off The Hook vs Black Angel vs Chew Disco vs Akbar.Um (Guest DJs)
  Kraak Gallery, Manchester, 24 Aug 2013

=== 2012 ===
- Pussy Whipped Festival (Main DJs)
  The Wee Red Bar, Edinburgh, 14-15 Sep 2012
- Trouble at t'Mill (Guest DJs)
  Islington Mill, Salford, 31 Aug 2012
- Off The Hook (Guest DJs)
  Kraak Gallery, Manchester, 14 Jul 2012
- Popular presents: GHXST, with Severin and Factory Acts (Support DJs)
  Kraak Gallery, Manchester, 21 Jun 2012

=== 2011 ===
- Lock Up Your Daughters, featuring Chew Disco, DJ Fatty Blaze, Prince Mog, and The Bloody Show (Guest DJs)
  The Flying Duck, Glasgow, 23 Sep 2011
- Islington Mill presents: MEN (w/JD Samson of Le Tigre) and Bonjay (Support DJs)
  Islington Mill, Salford, 8 Jun 2011
- Ladyfest Manchester (Guest DJs)
  Gullivers, Manchester, 13 Mar 2011

=== 2010 ===
- Nothing Special NYE, featuring Organ Freeman, Annie Rotkappchen and Danny Saul (Guest DJ)
  Islington Mill, Salford, 31 Dec 2010

== Hiatus ==
External videos
- I Am For You Can Enjoy: Excerpts from selected interviews, YouTube video
- I Am For You Can Enjoy - Opening at FACT, Homotopia 2016, YouTube video

Following the relocation of Obong to Berlin in 2015, the project entered hiatus. Between 2015 and 2019, the two continued to sporadically collaborate and DJ both as a duo and independently in the UK and Berlin.

In 2015, West began an Arts Council funded multimedia collaboration with British artist Ajamu X. The project, I Am For You Can Enjoy, combines West's video oral history interviews with Ajamu's portraits to explore the lived experiences of queer, Black, male and masculine-identified sex workers.
