= Homotopia (festival) =

LGBTQ+ arts festival in England

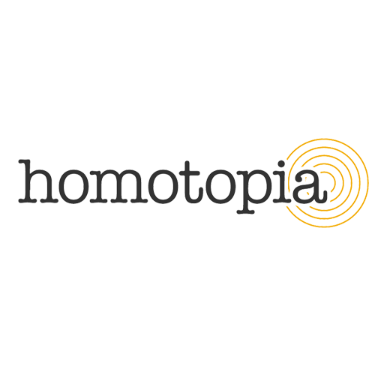
- Frequency: Annually in late October and November, some activities all year
- Locations: Liverpool, England and international
- Years active: 23
- Inaugurated: 2004
- Website: www.homotopia.net

Homotopia is an international LGBTQ+ arts festival held annually in Liverpool, England. The festival takes place in late-October and throughout November every year and features a mixture of theatre, dance, film, photography, art, cabaret and debate at numerous venues across Liverpool.

Homotopia is the longest running annual LGBT arts and culture festival in the United Kingdom.

== History ==
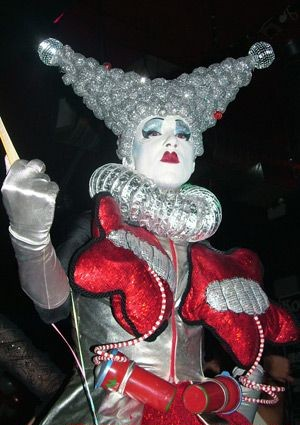
Homotopia 2004 Closing Party at The Masque, Liverpool

Homotopia was launched as a pilot project on 1 November 2004, in response to Liverpool's successful bid to become European Capital of Culture. The festival was commissioned by the Liverpool Culture Company's Creative Communities project, and started life as a ten-day programme of film, theatre, photography, art, comedy, storytelling and heritage designed to bring together an assortment of artists. Heavily supported by Liverpool City Council, the initiative was hailed as a sign of the city's 'growing maturity' in the run up to Capital of Culture and as an opportunity for the gay and lesbian community to play a vital part in the region's rich and diverse cultural life.

The first event was attended by some 2750 people, but by the following year its visitor numbers had doubled, partly due to the high calibre of guests who had featured including prominent gay rights activist Peter Tatchell.

By 2008, the festival had showcased the largest Tom of Finland art retrospective in the UK as well as the first ever North-West Grand Vogue Ball and visitor numbers had climbed to over 12,000. City leaders praised the celebration as a highlight of Liverpool's cultural calendar.

2009 marked a new chapter for Homotopia, when a youth visit to Poland helped to forge new international partnerships. The visit became instrumental in the development of the festival's international arts programme and burgeoning social justice work. The trip also inspired an anti-homophobia documentary and education pack, which was rolled out to 100 schools and youth centres across Liverpool, gaining notable support from out gay Hollywood actor Sir Ian McKellen.

Since 2010, in addition to offering its diverse Liverpool schedule, Homotopia's work has expanded internationally and attracted audiences at various functions in Turkey, Finland, Sweden and Russia.

In 2011, Homotopia was granted National Portfolio status by Arts Council England.

In 2018, Homotopia founder and long term Artistic Director, Gary Everett, parted ways with the organisation. Guest Curator, Cheryl Martin, led the programming of the 2018 festival.

After a period of uncertainty, the Board of Trustees appointed Char Binns as Festival Director in early 2020. Alex Ferguson was appointed as Producer to lead the organisation into a new era. The pair had previously managed the festival in a freelance capacity.

== Structure and governance ==
Homotopia was founded in 2004 as an unincorporated association, with a small grant from Liverpool City Council. In 2012, in the same year it was included in the Arts Council England National Portfolio of organisations (NPO), it became a private limited company limited by guarantee, with charitable aims. Its main annual funders are Arts Council England and Liverpool City Council.

== Past festivals ==
Year	Dates	Theme	Location of launch party	Description	Sources
2023	11 November until 22 December	Gods and Monsters			
2022	1 November until 20 November	Queer Joy Is A Protest	Tate Liverpool	Numerous events including: Cabaret by The Bitten Peach, Tea for T4T and Queer the City by Tabby Lamb and Andrew Bullock, This Charming Man by Sian Davies, Fashion Spies and Confetti by Will Jackson, Woman Hood by Ursula Graber, UTOPIAN by Symoné, Queer Punk is a Protest featuring Skinny Girl Diet, pink suits and Piss Kitti at Quarry. 'Where are all the lesbians' featuring Lynne Harwood, Mark Anthony, Chardine Taylor-Stone and Marcella Rick.	
2021	28 October until 14 November	Coming Out		Numerous events including: Jade Anouka - Debut of 'HEART' play, performance workshop and online watch party of Her & Her; Queer, As In Funny featuring Rosie Jones; Peter Groom presents Dietrich: Live; One in, One out - Liverpool’s smallest Gay Bar at Everyman’s Street Café; Darren Pritchard Dance presents the Family Vogue Ball; The Return of The Jinkx & De La Holiday Show, Live!; Yours Sincerely by Will Jackson; Sian Davies and Rosie Wilby present Breakup Monologues; The Village Hall by Tabby Lamb; Final Baby Girl by Baby Lame; David Hoyle evening of performance and provocation; Virtual events included Pearl Necklace, Round the Horne inspired queer sketch revue for the TikTok generation in partnership with District & DESPITE THE MONKEY, on-demand series of LGBTQIA film shorts from around the globe.	
2020	29 October until 15 November	Show Your Working		Over 20 events including: Fox Fisher: #Transtopia live screenprinting, Queer Bodies Workshop, Queer Arts North at Homotopia; My Genderation: Shorts, Screenings and Discussion; QueerCentric Music Night Concert; Eat Me: The Limited Edition; Chair Dancing Fitness Take 2, Mirror Mirror, A Lovely Word at Homotopia, Trans Creative at the Movies, Fox Fisher in conversation, Pride – Film With Pride, Collective Encounters: Queer Womxn in Action; Days Out, Drag Promenade, One Woman, TGPFEST – The Goddess Projects, Queer the City Art Crawl, Naomi Westerman's 'Woof Woof.'	
2019	31 October until 10 November	Resist! Resist!	Hope Street Hotel	Over 20 events including: An Evening with Travis Alabanza at Blackburne House, Keith Haring x Amy Lamé at Tate Liverpool, Sex Education by Harry Clayton-Wright, Nightclubbing by Rachael Young, Joan by Lucy J Skilbeck, Retro(per)spective by Split Britches, Strange Lands and How to Survive - Mandy Romero, The Gloop Show by Oozing Gloop, Stars by Mojisola Adebayo, Bona Pop - Created by DuoVision at The Gallery (Liverpool), Who Are We? - Xavier Velastín & Virág Pázmány. Commissioned by Homotopia, Pansy Boy - Paul Harfleet at St Helens Library, Queercentric Music Night (Collaboration with Liverpool Queer Collective), Queer Arts North at Homotopia (Collaboration with Curious Arts)	
2018	2 November until 1 December	I Will Survive	Hinterlands	Over 30 events including: John Waters: This Filthy World at Liverpool Philharmonic Hall, The Ginger Snapped: Jinkx Monsoon & Major Scales, Burgerz by Travis Alabanza, Fat Blokes by Scottee, 2018: Where Are All The Lesbians? produced by Liverpool Queer Collective, Rent Party, Hip Hip I'm Gay, Mop The House: A Short Guide to Vogue, Wake Up Together: Ren Hang (UK Premiere) and Robin Hammond's Where Love Is Illegal at the Open Eye Gallery	
2017	26 October until 25 November	Liberation 50	Double Tree Hotel	Over 50 events including: The Vaudevillians: Jinkx Monsoon & Major Scales, ICONS: Le Gateau Chocolat, Major exhibition at the Museum of Liverpool "Tales from the City" featuring a collection of tokens, clothes and ephemera charting LGBT+ history in Liverpool over the last 50 years; Coming Out: Sexuality, Gender and Identity at the Walker Art Gallery, Son of Liverpool: Gerry Potter, Medea, Written in Rage, Do You Mind If I Smoke? Memoirs of Fenella Fielding, You've Changed, Maggi Hambling: In Conversation; David Hoyle: Diamond, UK premier: Whitaker Malem Pop Artisans exhibition	
2016	October until November	Forbidden	Foundation for Art and Creative Technology	19 events across Liverpool including: The Rise and Fall of The Hamburger Queen by Ashleigh Owen and Paul Burke, Pride & Prejudice at Walker Art Gallery, Zoe Lyons : Little Misfit at Unity Theatre, Scratch & See at Unity Theatre (Featuring Divina DeCampo), Transformation: One Man's Cross-Dressing Wardrobe at Walker Art Gallery, Andrew Fekete: Out of Time at Victoria Gallery and Museum, David Hoyle - In the Company of Friends at Unity Theatre, Penny Arcade - Longing Lasts Longer at Unity Theatre, Queer in the Gallery at Walker Art Gallery	
2015	October until November	Art = Life	Camp and Furnace	Over 50 events including: Zanele Muholi - VUKANI/RISE at Open Eye Gallery, If These Spasms Could Speak at Citdel Theatre, Alien Sex Club by John Walter at Camp & Furnace and The Bluecoat, The Bride of Frankenstein - Liverpool Small Cinema, Dior and I at FACT Liverpool, Dir. Frédéric Tcheng, Celebration of Life for World AIDS Day, The Butch Monologues at Unity Theatre, Kate O'Donnell - Big Girl's Blouse at Unity Theatre, Theseus Beefcake - Produced by Panic Lab at Unity Theatre, Portrait of Jason at FACT Liverpool (Dir. Shirley Clarke, 1967), Sarah Waters: In Conversation, Jean Abreu Dance Blood, Le Gateau Chocolat - World of Glass, Pay It No Mind: The Life and Times of Marsha P. Johnson (dir. Michael Kasino, 2012), Middle of the Road - Bourgeois & Maurice and David Hoyle at Unity Theatre, Mandy Romero - Scandinavia Has Been Good To Me, Duckie: Twenty First Century Music Hall at Citadel Theatre. Featuring Amy Lame and the Duckie crew, Jack Rooke - Come Ride with Me, Panti Bliss - High Heels in Low Places at Epstein Theatre	
2014	23 October until 23 November	Miracle of Miracles	Hope Street Hotel	Over 30 events including: The Gang: Photographs by Catherine Opie at Walker Art Gallery, April Ashley: Portrait of a Lady at Museum of Liverpool, John - DV8 Physical Theatre at Liverpool Playhouse, David's Place - David Hoyle, Rainbow Jews at Unity Theatre, My Scouse Voice - Fenella Fielding at Unity Theatre, Transmitting Andy Warhol - Tate Liverpool, Now + Then: Three Decades of HIV in Merseyside at Museum of Liverpool, Terence Davies: In Conversation at The Black-E, Scars on Sunday: A Honky Tonk Mass at Fredericks. Starring David Hoyle, Mojisola Adebayo - Retrospective at Unity Theatre, David Mills - Gimme Some Sugar at Unity Theatre, Debs Gatenby - Hi Anxiety at Lantern Theatre, Nick Phillips (drag artist)|Nick Phillips - Ecce Homo at Unity Theatre, Still Ill at Lantern Theatre. From Truant, Homotopia & Oldham Coliseum	
2013	30 October until 25 November	The Liverpool Dream	Camp and Furnace	10-year anniversary events include: April Ashley: Portrait of a Lady at Museum of Liverpool, David Hockney: Early Reflections at Walker Art Gallery, Germ Free Adolescents at The Met Quarter, Boy George & Trademark: This Way Out at Camp and Furnace, Chelsea Hotel - at Unity Theatre, Sandi Toksvig: Funny Valentine at Philharmonic Hall, Dickie Beau - Lost in Trans at Unity Theatre, John Waters - This Filthy World at Philharmonic Hall, David Hoyle - In the Company of Friends at Unity Theatre, I Am Divine screening at FACT Liverpool (2012), Mis Les - Caz n Britney at Unity Theatre, House of Suarez at The Bluecoat, Ronald Wright In Conversation, The Piers From Here - Alvin Baltrop and Gordon Matta-Clark at Open Eye Gallery, Chew Disco (Chew Disco) - featuring Vaginal Davis, Shopping, and ILL at The Kazimier	
2012	30 October until 25 November	Traditional Family Values	Camp and Furnace	Over 20 events including: Duggie Fields: Welcome to My World at The Gallery, Mark Morrisroe at Open Eye Gallery. Part of Liverpool Biennial, Enrico David brought Madreperlage to Walker Art Gallery, Council House Movie Star, an immersive film and theatre experience at The Gallery, Camp and Furnace, Scottie Road the Musical - Caz n Britney at Unity Theatre, Uganda Pride - Rachel Adams at Unity Theatre, The Girl I Left Behind Me, produced by Opera North at Unity Theatre, Horsemat, A Beautiful Hell, Bitter Suite - Gary Clarke. Liverpool Hope University, Lavender Girls at Unity Theatre, Blackouts - Dixie Beau at Unity Theatre, Archetype - David Hoyle at Walker Art Gallery, I Remember and Teenage (2012), dir. Matt Wolf at FACT Liverpool, Epstein: The Man Who Made The Beatles - Andrew Sherlock at Epstein Theatre, Patrick Wolf - 10th Anniversary Acoustic World Tour at The Gallery, Call Me Kuchu (2012) dir. Katherine Fairfax-Wright, Malika Zouhali-Worrall at FACT Liverpool, Promoting Human Dignity (2012) from Homotopia TV, April Ashley exhibition at Museum of Liverpool	
2011	1 November until 30 November	Cruising for Art	Hope Street Hotel	Over 30 events including: UK Premiere: Dykeotomy, UK Premiere: Berlin-Yogyakarta: From Hitler's Terror To Human Rights Today, Cancerous Lipstick by Ben Youdan & No Narcissus by Dawn Brayford, Totally Frocked Up! An exhibition of photographs by Andy Green, World Premiere: Joseph Mercier Company – Cruising, Clubbing, Fucking, Rock Hudson: Dark and Handsome Stranger, Policing Sex Between Men: 1850 – 1971, World Premiere: Savage Style: costumes from Lily Savage's wardrobe, World Premiere: PIN UPS, 'The Male Species' Dance Trilogy, Lavender Girls, A Taste of Honey 50th Anniversary screening, Earthfall presents: At Swim, Two Boys, The Featherstonehaughs presents EDITS, In The Company of Friends 'Literary Night', Face to Face: An Audience with David Hoyle, 'Underclass Hero' featuring La John Joseph, A Hard Rain by John Bradfield & Martin Hooper, Tranny Hotel – Liverpool, Alternative Miss Liverpool, The British Guide To Showing Off, Homotopia Short Film Night at FACT, Tomboy, Live Loud & Proud, Youth Film Night at FACT, An Audience with April Ashley	
2010	1 November until 30 November	Love Conquers All		Over 50 events including: Mother/Son by Jeffrey Solomon, Factory Floor - evening of new work by Clare Duffy, Abi Lake, Louie Jenkins and Carrie Whittaker, Caroline Wilson and Emily Underwood-Lee, Guillermo Gómez-Peña & La Pocha Nostra: Corpo Ilicito, Richard Haynes: Listen to My Secret Fetish, UK Premiere: Giselle, or I'm Too Horny To Be A Prince, Crotch by Keith Hennessey, The Factory, Manmade, Lavender Club, Call My Puff with David Hoyle, Doreen Kum Kwik, Margi Clarke. Compered by Terry Titter, Planet Young – Gerry Potter & Jay Bernard, Stella Duffy - Reading from her new historical novel Theodora; actress, empress, whore, Afternoon Tea With Armistead Maupin, Gay Thursday: In Lust A Presentation by the Centre of Cultural Confusion, Getting Your Work Published with Gerry Potter, Stella Duffy, Jay Bernard and Claire Campbell, World Premiere of Pink: Past & Present - Documentary of Liverpool's LGBT heritage, The Powerhouse of Supermen: Does gay culture exclude 'otherness'?, Midnight Mass: Peaches Christ presents International Premiere of 'All About Evil', Queering The Portrait, Right To Love – Youth social justice and anti hate-crime campaign, including Project Triangle, Big Gay Kiss exhibition, Sex, Drags, Rock’n’Roll; Big Gay Prom, Big Gay Night In	
2009	1 November until 30 November	Homotopia Not Homophobia		Over 30 events including: Girls Go Down - lesbian evening of pop, electro, retro, indie, 1980s, 1990s and 2000s, My Turkish Delight By Stan Jones & Sarah Atkins-Navas, Insight Photography My World, My Story; Extraordinary Drawings by New York's Laurie Lipton, Chris Von Steiner exhibition, Memories of Yankel Feather, Project Triangle - a unique arts & social justice initiative whereby 12 young people travelled to Auschwitz and Warsaw, Truant Company presents Caretakers by Billy Cowan, Sarah Waters: In Conversation, Lau your Luppers on the Strillers Bona: The rise and fall of Polari – lecture on the secret language of gay men, Charlotte Mendelson & Joanna Briscoe, Clare Summerskill: In No Particular Order!, Lavender Girls with Rosie Wilby, Jane Townend (both Nivea Funny Women finalists) Emma Bowley and local newcomer Norma KC; UK Premiere: The Invisible Death of Michael - short film on homophobic murder of Michael Causer, Liverpool Is Burning, The Grand Vogue Ball (The Movie); Pere Faura, Striptease; Music in the afternoon with Steve McFarlane, Little Boy Written by Tommy Kearney, Directed by Steve Miller; Gay Sunday at FACT Cinema	
2008	1 November until 30 November	From Liverpool With Love	Hope Street Hotel	Over 50 events including: Tom of Finland – the biggest retrospective of his iconic gay male images ever exhibited in the UK, April Ashley, Maggi Hambling, Jake Arnott, Jackie Kay, Holly Woodlawn; The North West's first ever Grand Vogue Ball, produced by Duckie and House of Suarez; David Hoyle	
2007	1 November until 19 November	All Things Bright and Beautiful	Hope Street Hotel	Over 70 events including: 'Gay Jackanory' with Patrick Gale, Stella Duffy, Paul Burston, Helen Walsh & others; The Pansy Project; 'Walk This Way', Launch of Homotopia TV – Liverpool's own Queer TV station, 'Venus as a Boy', Amy Lame's Mama Cass Family Singers	
2006	26 October until 18 November	A Queer New World		Over 70 events including: Launch of Queercore, Liverpool Lesbian & Gay Film Festival - over 30 screenings across the city, Nigel Charnock and Company, Fierce and Quarantine, Bare Bones - dance company performance, A new work by theatre company Truant, The Lavender Club - comedy, music and stand up, Super club Federation party night, Special appearance by Wimfest, Special event with Holocaust survivor Janni Kowalski, Our Story Liverpool - Liverpool LGBT archive, Announcement of new media sponsors Gay Times, Q-Soft and Gaydar, Out North West and Real Liverpool	
2005	31 October until 12 November	There's no place like Homotopia	Alma De Cuba	Over 50 events including: Special retrospective exhibition by the Liverpool born artist TRADEMARK, Performance of 'From Scottie Road to Harvard' by Chloe Poems at Unity Theatre, Liverpool; The Lavender Club - featuring local, national and international artists; 'Lavender All at Sea' special event aboard Britain's only touring theatre ship the SS Carroldo, which features the award-winning play ‘Laramie Project’, an American story about the murder of Matthew Shepard which became a worldwide symbol of intolerance; Series of educational and topical events, collaborating with international artists Tim Miller and Bridge Markland; 'Tales from Yester-Queer', 'Queer Conversations' with guests from politics, literature and theatre including Peter Tatchell interview; Special all female production of 'Entartete Muzik' to celebrate lesbian and gay music during Nazi Germany, The Liverpool Lesbian & Gay Film Festival - over 20 film screenings including ‘What Ever Happened to Baby Jane?’, UK premieres of 'Straight Jacket' and the German documentary ‘Men Heroes and Gay Nazis’; 'Queen's Jewels' in association with Black History Month	
2004	1 November until 11 November	Pilot Festival		"Gayzin' Liverpool" – documentary by local film-maker Sandi Hughes, 'It's A Drag' - exhibition documenting the lives of club performers and drag artists in Liverpool's gay scene, Hello Sailor exhibition - major collaboration of gay and lesbian artists including Sadie Lee, Trademark© and Holly Johnson (Frankie Goes To Hollywood); 'Tales From Yester-Queer' – audio archive of Liverpool's lesbian and gay past, Premiere of the Liverpool Lesbian and Gay Film Festival - 12 film screenings, workshops and master-classes featuring lesbian and gay filmmakers at various venues including the FACT, Unity Theatre, Liverpool University and The Stanley Theatre; The Lavender Club - Comedy, music and poetry with Lady Sian, Chloe Poems and Terry Kilkelly; Performance of Bent (play), Stepford - Performance by Lady Sian	

== Gallery ==
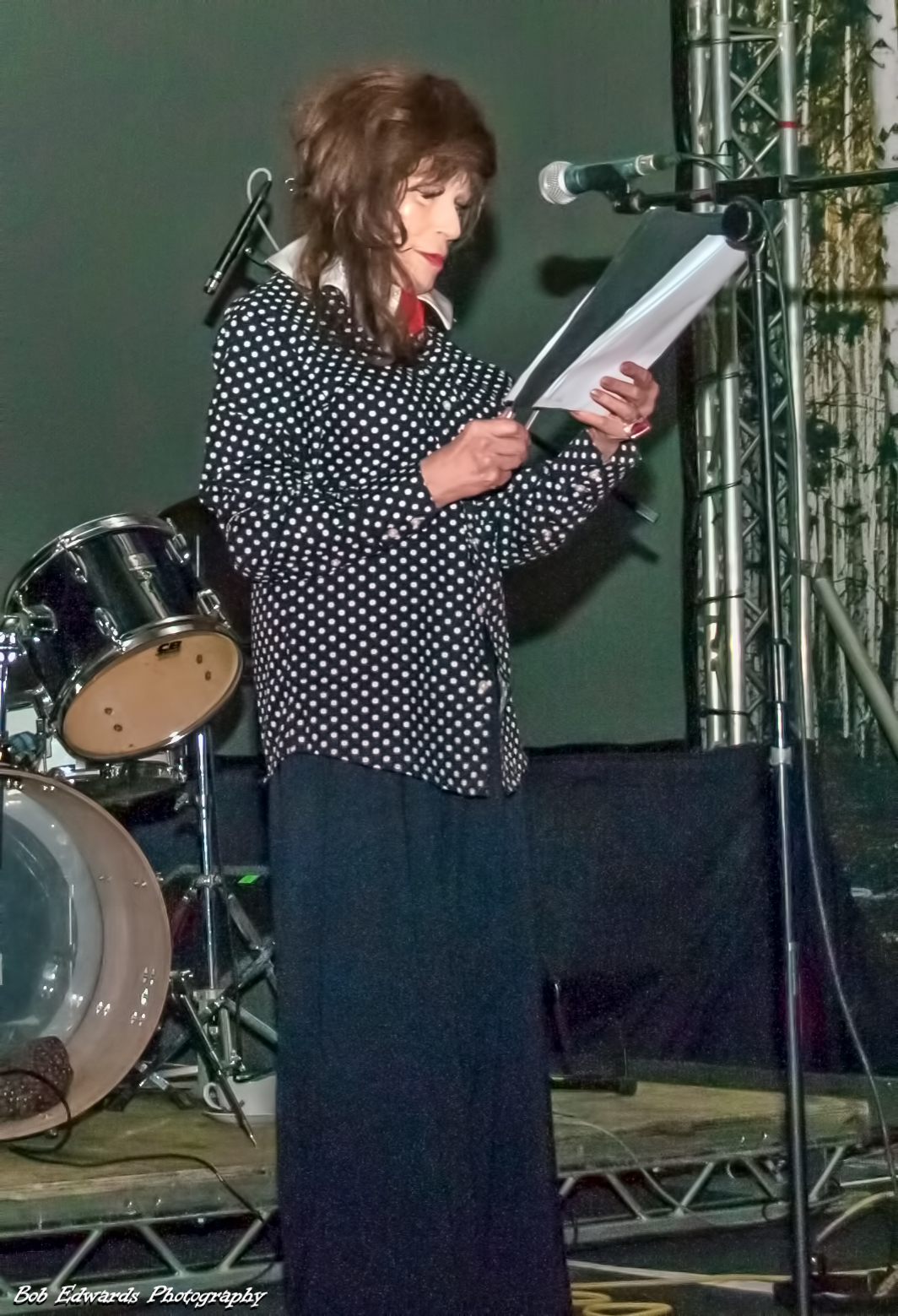
Fenella Fielding, Homotopia 2015 launch at Camp and Furnace

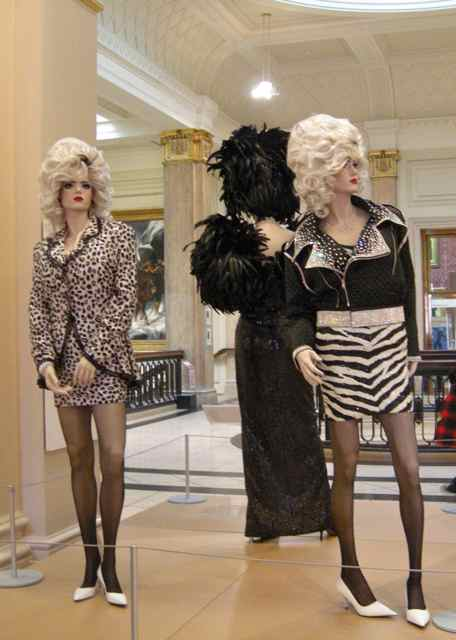
World premiere of 'Savage Style', 2011 festival: Outfits worn by Lily Savage

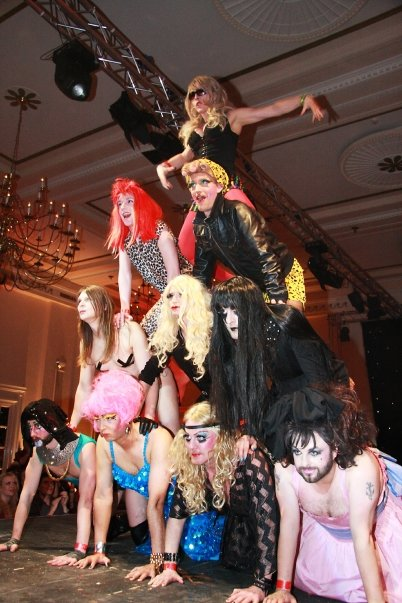
The Liverpool Grand Vogue Ball, 2008 festival

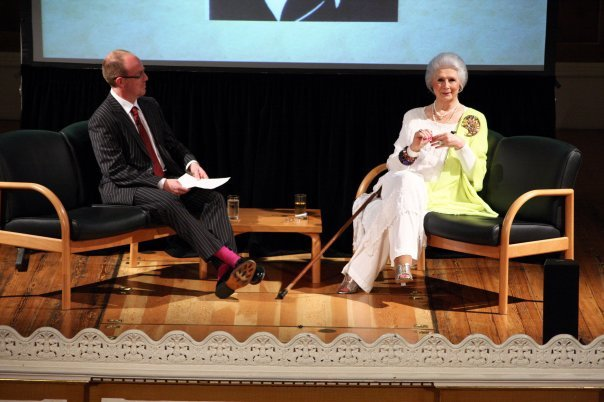
An Evening With April Ashley, 2008 festival

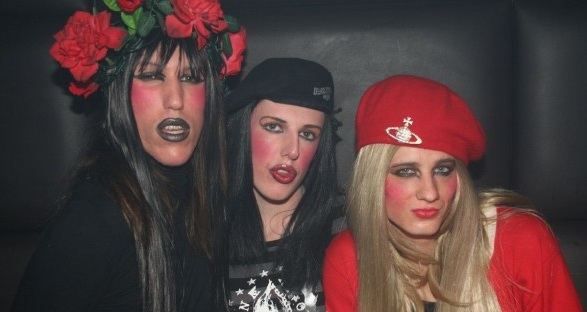
Club Federation @ 2006 festival

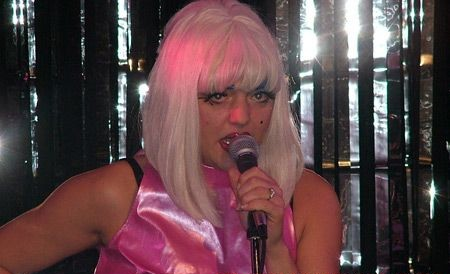
Lady Sian @ The Lavender Club (Unity Theatre), 2004 festival

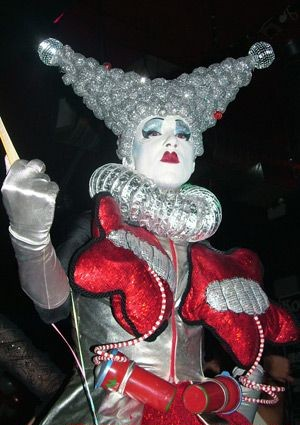
Homotopia 2004 Closing Party @ The Masque, Liverpool

== Global impact of the festival ==
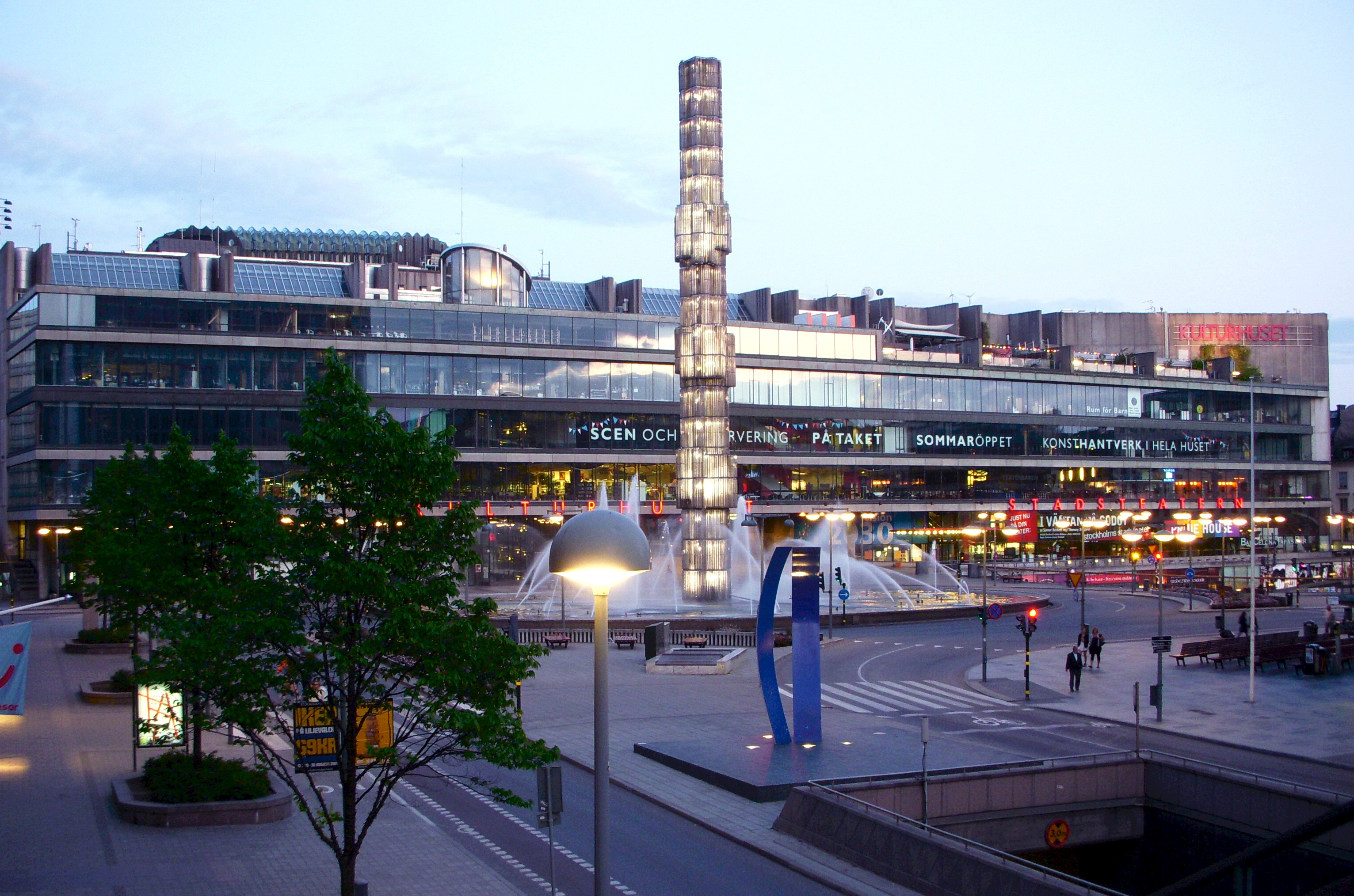
Stockholm's Kulturhuset cultural centre, host venue to Tom of Finland exhibition (Homotopia 2012)

Over the years, the Homotopia festival has forged links with groups and organisations around the world and its international work includes the following...

- Homotopia 2012, in association with the Finnish Consulate, developed a new human rights led project in St. Petersburg. 'Art As Social Change' chronicled the emergence of gay rights movements in the UK and Europe through photographs, testimonies and film.
- Homotopia brought its Tom of Finland exhibition to Kulturhuset, Stockholm in June 2012.
- In 2012, Homotopia launched the world's first IDAHO 50, a collaboration with 50 of Liverpool's leading companies, organisations and institutions to support action against Homophobia & Transphobia.
- In 2011, Homotopia's Tom of Finland exhibition formed part of the official programme for Turku's European Capital of Culture year. It attracted a record audience of 90,000 to the Logomo space.
- In November 2011, Tranny Hotel was held in Liverpool as part of the European-wide transgender arts festival. The city was one of only 11 cities in Europe to hold the event.
- In December 2010, Homotopia produced a series of interventions, debates and research culminating with the Pansy Project in Istanbul, Turkey as part of its European Capital of Culture year. Hundreds of pansies were planted to symbolize the ongoing international struggle for LGBT rights and equality.
- In 2009, 12 young people from Homotopia's Project Triangle went to Auschwitz and Warsaw to learn about the Holocaust. A group of young LGBTQ people from Poland's KPH travelled to Liverpool to learn from Merseyside Police, Merseyside Fire and Rescue Service and Liverpool City Council. The visit inspired a training programme for Polish police.
