= Fat Girl Gets a Haircut =

Play by Mark Storor

The Fat Girl Gets a Haircut
- Written by: Mark Storor
- Characters: Laurie Briggs; Alexus Burke; Jacob Crossley; Kadeem Deane; Rory Edmonds; Rosie Evans-Hill; Ashleigh Monagle; Yasmin Rackal; Miran Salman; Ishbel Tunnadine; Dharshinee Vogel

Premiere
- Date: 26 April 2011

The Fat Girl Gets a Haircut and other Stories is a 12-part play, created by artist Mark Storor in collaboration with a cast of teenage actors. The play was first performed in The Roundhouse at Chalk Farm, North London, UK, on 26 April 2011, and set to run until 7 May 2011. Artist / Director Mark Storor is known for his work in the play For the Best at the (Unicorn Theatre, London, and Unity Theatre, Liverpool) about a dialysis drama for children. Musical Director Jules Maxwell was in charge of the neo-classical score, while animator Babis Alexiadis provided rich and sensory illustrations throughout the play.

The 12 portraits are tales of love, family, sexuality, religion, bullying, angst, freedom, lust, and abstract interpretations of modern teenage challenges concerning insecurities, rebellion, acceptance, and the ultimate path to adulthood.

== Making ==
The play was two years in the making, with Mark Storor meeting with 11 young teenagers once a week, teaching them about the techniques of theatre. The company crafted stories providing insight into teenage life in Britain in modern times. Few words were spoken throughout the play, but wide range of music, from jazz, jive, boogie, to ballad, served as the vessel to unfolding the many layers of symbolism and ethereal voyage of teenagers' minds.

== Reviews ==
The play was well received by critics, given 4 stars out of 5 by The Guardian (UK), and Time Out (London). British Theatre Guide also made positive reviews, praising the fascinating insights of the play, and the artistic crafts of Babis Alexiadis:

Babis Alexiadis' projected animation is a wonder to behold as birds flutter in between the Roundhouse's internal archways and suddenly a female student's crush is revealed in all his glory. Ships set sail across the ocean and a portly pig slowly trots around the arena, all rendered in beautiful illustration and accompanied by a glorious soundtrack.

== Play ==
The Fat Girl Gets a Haircut and other Stories:

1. We Let Them Look at Us
2. And Then I Fell
3. Swallow 1
4. Burlesque Boy part 1
5. The Boy Who Cried for the World
6. Burlesque Boy part 2
7. Infidel
8. Daddy's Girl
9. My Body My Secret
10. Swallow 2
11. How to Make a Paper Daffodil
12. Fairground
