= Fekete (surname) =

The Hungarian-language surname Fekete literally means “black” and may refer to:

- Ádám Fekete (born 1988), a Hungarian footballer
- Andrew Fekete (artist) (1954–1986), British-Hungarian artist, diarist, and poet
- Andrew Fekete (cricketer) (born 1985), Australian cricketer
- Árpád Fekete (1921–2012), Hungarian football player and manager
- Attila Fekete (disambiguation)
  - Attila Fekete (fencer) (born 1974), Romanian-born Hungarian fencer
  - Attila Fekete (footballer) (born 1987), Hungarian footballer
- Benedek Szabolcs Fekete (born 1977), Hungarian Roman Catholic prelate
- Brian Fekete (born 1990), American soccer player
- Ferenc Fekete (1914–1981), Hungarian cinematographer
- Gene Fekete (1922–2011), American football player
- István Fekete (1900–1970), Hungarian writer
- Jean-Daniel Fekete (born 1963), French computer scientist
- László Fekete
  - László Fekete (footballer) (1954–2014), Hungarian footballer
  - László Fekete (strongman) (born 1958), Hungarian strongman
- Liz Fekete, director of the Institute of Race Relations
- Maria von Tasnady (1911–2001) born Mária Tasnádi Fekete, Hungarian actress
- Michael Fekete (1886–1957), Israeli-Hungarian mathematician
- Mihály Fekete (1884–1960), Hungarian actor, screenwriter and film director
- Nicholas Fekete (born 1962), Canadian pentathlete
- Róbert Fekete (born 1971), Hungarian footballer
- Szilveszter Fekete (born 1955), Hungarian water polo coach
- Vladimír Fekete (born 1955), Slovak-born Roman Catholic prelate
