= Graeme Phillips =

British artistic director of theatre (1948–2025)

Graeme Phillips MBE
- Born: Graeme James Phillips; April 1948
- Died: August 2025 (aged 77); Liverpool, England
- Education: Royal Central School of Speech and Drama
- Occupations: Theatre director; artistic director
- Years active: c. 1970s–2015 (as artistic director) c. 1970s–2025 (as theatre director)
- Employer(s): Unity Theatre (1982–2015)

Graeme James Phillips MBE (April 1948 – August 2025) was a British theatre director who was the artistic director of the Unity Theatre, Liverpool. During his tenure, several touring theatre companies came to Liverpool, as well as a production of the play Angels in America by Tony Kushner. He also helped establish both FACT Liverpool and the Homotopia festival.

== Life and career ==
Phillips was born in April 1948. He trained at the Royal Central School of Speech and Drama in London and then worked around the UK including in Ipswich, Leeds, London, Crewe and the Gateway Theatre in Chester. He joined Merseyside Unity Theatre, which later became the Unity Theatre, in 1982. He was influential in the transformation of a dilapidated synagogue to a modern theatre, overseeing two capital redevelopments of the premises, and ultimately becoming its artistic director in the early 1990s. Touring theatre companies he brought to Liverpool included Told by an Idiot, Frantic Assembly, The Right Size, and Improbable. He noted Angels in America by Tony Kushner and David Yip's Gold Mountain as two personal highlights of his time at the Unity.

He also played a key role in establishing the purpose-built media and electronic arts centre FACT Liverpool, which opened in 2003, and in launching the Homotopia festival in 2004. Both were initially based in the Unity Theatre building.

He retired as artistic director of the Unity Theatre in 2015, and that year was awarded an MBE in the 2015 New Year's Honours for his services to the arts in Liverpool.

Phillips continued to direct productions after his retirement as artistic director. In 2024 he directed a revival of Krapp's Last Tape by Samuel Beckett, bringing to the play his own experience of dementia. Phillips started working on a production of The Maids by Jean Genet in April 2025.

Phillips lived in Green Heys Care Home, a care home in Liverpool, from 2021 due to the progression of Lewy body dementia. On 1 September 2025, the Unity Theatre announced his death at the age of 77, which occurred at the care home in August from complications of Parkinson's disease, with which he had been diagnosed in 2015. The production of The Maids, scheduled to open in October, was taken over by Elinor Randle, the Unity Theatre's artistic director since 2024.
