= Seleena Daye =

Textile artist, zine maker, and musician

Seleena Daye (born 1984) is a textile artist, zine maker, and musician based in Manchester, UK. Her work often focuses on race, class, sexuality, and gender, taking inspiration from 90s pop culture.

== Zines ==
Daye began making zines in the 1990s. "Zines came at a time in my life when I had a lot of penpals and was trying to find like-minded people, pre internet. It's just something I fell in love with. Something that made me lifelong friends and part of a community."

Several of Daye's zines are fanzines dedicated to pop culture such as My Mad Fat Zine (2016) Without you I'm nothing (2012) and Diary of a crush (2012).

Daye also creates political zines relating to race, class, and sexuality including Brown girls (2017– ), and Happy alone (2016).

Daye co-created Poor Lass zine (2014 - 2018) with fellow zine maker Em Ledger as a collaborative zine sharing stories by working-class people. The zine series later became a podcast series running for 19 episodes.

In 2018 Daye co-founded Over Here Zine Fest with Heena Patel and Melissa John-Charles. The zine fest is dedicated to showcasing self-publishing by global majority creators and was originally held in conjunction with the Black Writers Conference in Manchester. The zine fest is held annually at the People's History Museum.

== Music ==
Daye has performed in a number of riot grrrl inspired acts. Daye together with Holly Casio founded the first Radical Cheerleading troupe in the UK. The duo made their debut at Ladyfest London 2002 and went on to perform with acts such as Valerie, The Blue Minkies, Bis, and Gossip.

Daye played drums with the band and art collective Yiiikes! as well as the Clueless inspired punk band The Whatevers. She performed as a tap dancer at the 2015 London Slayerfest.

== Art ==
Daye creates textile art using felt and embroidery. Her work is influenced by the 'make do and mend' ethos, and views craft as an accessible and affordable skill to share with others.

In 2021, Daye's banner The journey we made across land and sea, to build a country not made for me, was commissioned by the People's History Museum as part of a two year programme exploring migration. Daye describes the aim of the banner to speak about "the hostility migrants face when coming to the UK, the narrative told in mainstream media and the poor treatment, not just as workers, but as people."

=== Exhibitions ===
==== Solo exhibitions ====
Brown girl in the pit, Nexus Art Cafe (2017)

What, is she Black now?, Bury Art Museum (2017)

What, is she Black now?, Z-Arts (2017)

Make a cup of tea, put a record on, Turnpike Gallery (2013)

==== Group exhibitions ====
Nature week, Museum of the Home (2022)

Migration, People's History Museum (2021)

Everything I know, I felt. The Lowry (2020)

Decolonise Fest art show, 198 Gallery (2018)

The glowing world of snotboobs and the severed toe, Islington Mill (2014)
