= Andrew Fekete =

Andrew Fekete may refer to:

- Andrew Fekete (cricketer)
- Andrew Fekete (artist)
