= Rosie Wilby =

English stand-up comedian

Rosie Wilby (born 1970 in Liverpool) is an English comedian based in South London.

== Career ==
Born in Liverpool, Wilby grew up in Ormskirk, and studied at the University of York, where one of her contemporaries was fellow comic Zoe Lyons. Moving to North London in 1993, Wilby secured a place on the ft2 Film and Television freelance training scheme and worked on shows including Later... with Jools Holland, and was an extra in British television drama The Politician's Wife. She went on to work on the BFI/Maya Vision co-production A Bit of Scarlet, before becoming a trainee reporter on BBC Radio 5's Out This Week. Between 1997 and 2000, she was a regular music journalist for Time Out London, as well as writing for NME, and had her own column called "Rosie's Pop Diary" in the now defunct Making Music magazine. As a music journalist, she interviewed, among others, Beth Orton, Suzanne Vega, Stereophonics and the band Muse.

=== Music ===
In 1996 she formed a band named Wilby, which released an album entitled Precious Hours in July 2000 on her own label, Cat Flap Recordings. The album launch gig at Ronnie Scott's Jazz Club was reviewed in The Guardian, who praised Wilby's "glorious" voice. Rosie went solo and supported artists including Bob Geldof, Jamie Cullum, Midge Ure, Glenn Tilbrook and John Grant's band The Czars. She also performed on the Left Field stage at the Glastonbury Festival in 2005.

=== Move into comedy ===
In 2004, after positive comments about her between song banter, she entered the stand-up competition So You Think You're Funny and got through to the semi-finals. She also reached the Laughing Horse competition semi-finals in 2005 and then the Funny Women final in 2006, held at the Comedy Store, compered by Shappi Khorsandi. Other finalists that year included Holly Walsh and Susan Calman. In 2007, Wilby reached the final of the Leicester Mercury Comedian of the Year and the semi-finals of the Amused Moose competition.

She has taken several shows to the Edinburgh Festival Fringe and on tour around the UK, including a spoof lecture about memory called "I am Nesia" and another spoof lecture about sex, "The Science of Sex", which won a Fringe Report Award 2010 and saw her being invited on to BBC Radio 4's Woman's Hour and Loose Ends. The show was revived in 2012 for two performances at the 2012 Green Man Festival in Wales.

Her follow-up show, "Rosie's Pop Diary", was based on her music career and later became "How (not) to Make it in Britpop". She spoke about it with Libby Purves on BBC Radio 4's Midweek.

In 2011, she co-wrote and co-starred in the short film The Bride and Bride, alongside fellow comic Sarah Campbell, which was screened at the 2011 London Lesbian and Gay Film Festival.

In 2012, she appeared at the Bloomsbury Theatre alongside Jen Brister, Zoe Lyons and Susan Calman in aid of a Stonewall UK charity event that was headlined by Sarah Millican. In August 2012, Wilby appeared alongside Jenny Eclair and Ellie Taylor at the Hackney Empire, part of the season "Ha Ha Hackney". Every year from 2006 to 2012 she appeared at Homotopia Festival in Liverpool, where Diva Magazine editor Jane Czyzselska described her as a "lesbian Eddie Izzard". She now performs in comedy clubs across the UK and has also performed at Polari literary salon with Paul Burston in 2012 and at the South Bank Women of the World (WOW) Festival in 2013.

=== Radio & Podcasts ===
Wilby has appeared on BBC Radio 4 Woman's Hour and Loose Ends, BBC Radio 5, LBC and BBC London, but is best known for presenting a weekly LGBT magazine show, Out in South London, on London-based non-profit community radio station Resonance FM. Notable guests on the show have included k.d. lang, Sarah Waters, and Peter Tatchell. Wilby appears in the Sound Women 200 List featuring women working in the audio and radio industry.

Wilby created her podcast The Breakup Monologues in December 2018. Famous guests include Dolly Alderton, Brett Goldstein, Katy Brand, Richard Herring, Helen Lederer and Samantha Baines.

=== Books ===
Rosie Wilby's first book Is Monogamy Dead? was published in 2017. The book followed her show and Ted talk Is Monogamy dead? and was longlisted for the Polari First Book Prize 2018. Her second book The Breakup Monologues followed the podcast, and was published in 2021.

== Personal life ==
Wilby has written about being an openly lesbian performer, and her sexuality features heavily in her creative output. She wrote an article for The Guardian on being a lesbian comedian and an article in the Independent Online about "coming out". In 2011 she performed a fusion of stand up and film called I'm Dreaming of a Pink Christmas at the Rich Mix in East London, which explored why Christmas is a far from conventional time for people who are LGBT.
