= David Bellhouse =

English builder (1764-1840)

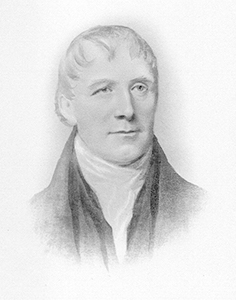
- English builder
- Born: February 8, 1764; Leeds
- Died: 1840 (aged 75–76)
- Occupation: builder

David Bellhouse (February 8, 1764 – 1840) was an English builder who did much to shape Victorian-era Manchester, both physically and socially.

== Biography ==
Born in Leeds, Bellhouse received no formal education. An autodidact, he taught himself to read and write and the elements of arithmetic and technical drawing. In 1786, he moved to Manchester where he married Mary Wainwright and took up employment as a joiner with the building firm of Thomas Sharp. Sharp died in 1803 and his family had little appetite for the business so it was acquired by Bellhouse.

During the Industrial Revolution there was a mass movement of workers towards Manchester to take up employment in the cotton spinning and textile industry. This created a demand for cheap housing and Bellhouse and his partners were among several tradesmen builders who made their fortunes in property speculation. From the early nineteenth century, Bellhouse expanded into the construction of complete factories and into work as a surveyor and valuer.

His firm enjoyed the sole contracts for the erection of several public buildings, including the Portico Library, Islington Mill and the old Town Hall in King Street.

Bellhouse was active in Manchester cultural life being a founder member of the Portico Library and the Royal Manchester Institution, now the Manchester Art Gallery. Bellhouse and his wife supported many social and charitable causes, especially for workers' education, and Bellhouse was one of the founders of the Manchester Mechanics' Institute (fore-runner of UMIST).

In 1824, he was elected one of the Police Commissioners who comprised Manchester's local government, making use of the office in furthering his building enterprise. He held the post until 1832.

Bellhouse and his wife had five sons who continued the family building trade.

== E. T. Bellhouse ==
Edward Taylor Bellhouse (1816–1881), one of the grandsons of David Bellhouse (1764–1840), founded E. T. Bellhouse and Co. This company was a famous manufacturer of iron buildings. Prince Albert ordered an iron ball-room for Balmoral Castle. E.T Bellhouse was Elected to membership of the Manchester Literary and Philosophical Society on 21 April 1857. Bridge over the River Medlock on Charles St Manchester.
