= Out in South London =

English Radio Program

Out in South London is a weekly arts and culture LGBT radio show broadcast on Resonance 104.4FM every Tuesday at 6.30pm. The show was devised and is presented by comedian Rosie Wilby.

== History ==
Out in South London was started by stand-up comedian and musician, Rosie Wilby, as a monthly show on South City Radio in Peckham in December 2008. Rosie was inspired by shows like Out This Week on Radio 5 Live in the 1990s, where she once worked as a trainee reporter. The show transferred to Resonance 104.4FM in late 2009 as a weekly half hour show. The show was guest presented for two weeks in May 2012 by journalist and author Paul Burston who also appeared in the 2011 Christmas special. It is featured as an iTunes podcast under the category 'philosophy'. In 2013, the show went to a weekly full hour format, going out live each Tuesday between 6.30pm and 7.30pm. In March 2013 Out in South London was a 'community partner' of the London Lesbian and Gay Film Festival.

=== Notable Guests ===
- Leslie Jordan American actor and playwright (18 January 2011 and 12 March 2013)
- Peter Tatchell, political campaigner (26 April 2011)
- k.d. lang singer songwriter (26 April 2011)
- Bette Bourne (3 February 2010 and 19 March 2013)
- Erin McKeown (5 February 2013)
- Wallis Bird Irish singer songwriter (19 April 2011)
- Heather Peace actress and musician (26 October 2010)
- Patrick Wolf singer songwriter (14 June 2011)
- Zoe Lyons stand-up comedian (26 July 2011)
- Jen Brister stand-up comedian (15 November 2011)
- Allegra McEvedy chef, broadcaster and writer (17 January 2012)
- David McAlmont vocalist and songwriter (1 February 2011)
- Ian Shaw singer (9 October 2012)
- Stella Duffy writer and performer (January 2009)
- Penny Arcade performer (12 June 2012)
- Sarah Waters novelist (19 October 2010)
- Paul Burston Journalist and author (8 March 2010, 9 April 2013)
- Julie Bindel, Journalist and writer (9 April 2013)
- Amy Lamé performer, writer and TV presenter (27 December 2012 and 5 March 2013)
- Nona Hendryx vocalist and musician (20 November 2012)
- Patty Schemel American drummer, formerly of the band Hole (20 November 2012)
- David Bedella American TV and stage actor (3 July 2012)
- Lea DeLaria American comedian, actress, and jazz musician (8 May 2012).

=== Reception ===
Elisabeth Mahoney in the Guardian described the show as "ambitiously wide-ranging" "a likeable listen" and " a bright, strong show."
