= The Official Body =

Studio album by Shopping
- Released: 19 January 2018
- Genres: Post-punk; funk rock; new wave; post-rock; surf rock
- Length: 40:54
- Label: FatCat
- Producer: Edwyn Collins

Shopping chronology
Why Choose (2015)	The Official Body (2018)	All or Nothing (2020)

Singles from The Official Body
- 1. "The Hype" Released: 25 September 2017

The Official Body is the third studio album by British post-punk band Shopping. It was released on 19 January 2018 through FatCat Records.

== Critical reception ==
Professional ratings
Aggregate scores
Source	Rating
AnyDecentMusic?	7.1/10
Metacritic	76/100
Review scores
Source	Rating
AllMusic	4.5/5 stars
The A.V. Club	B+
Clash	8/10
Exclaim!	6/10
NME	3/5 stars
Pitchfork	8.1/10
Record Collector	4/5 stars
The Skinny	5/5 stars
Uncut	7/10
Vice (Expert Witness)	A−

The Official Body was met with generally positive reviews. At Metacritic, which assigns a normalised rating out of 100 to reviews from professional critics, the album received an average score of 76, based on 15 reviews. Tom Hull gave it an A-minus and said that the "songs are tight, clean, [and] have a rhythm and tone similar to that of such classic post-punk bands as Wire, Gang of Four, and Joy Division. More mixed of opinion, Freaky Trigger's Tom Ewing felt that the album's bass-led post-punk sound was too faithful to source inspirations like ESG and the Au Pairs, and thus restrictive in sound, though he did praise Rachel Aggs' guitar work.

== Track listing ==
All music is composed by Shopping.

No.	Title	Length
1.	"The Hype"	3:55
2.	"Wild Child"	2:22
3.	"Asking for a Friend"	2:42
4.	"Suddenly Gone"	2:38
5.	"Shave Your Head"	2:54
6.	"Discover"	3:01
7.	"Control Yourself"	4:12
8.	"My Dad's a Dancer"	2:14
9.	"New Values"	3:43
10.	"Overtime"	3:53
Total length:		31:31

== Personnel ==
The following individuals were credited with the album's production and artwork.

- Edwyn Collins — Producer
- DLT Design — Layout
- Billy Easter — Cover Photo
- Shopping — Design, Layout, Primary Artist
- Matthew Williams — Inside Photo
