= All or Nothing (Shopping album) =

Studio album by Shopping
- Released: 7 February 2020
- Studios: Hurley Studios, Costa Mesa, California
- Genres: Dark wave; disco; dance-punk; funk rock; post-punk; synth-pop
- Length: 30:54
- Label: FatCat
- Producer: Davey Warsop

Shopping chronology
The Official Body (2018)	All or Nothing (2020)

Singles from The Official Body
- 1. "Initiative" Released: 6 December 2019; 2. "For Your Pleasure" Released: 28 January 2020

All or Nothing is the fourth and final studio album by British post-punk band Shopping. It was released on 7 February 2020 through FatCat Records.

Stylistically All or Nothing has been described by contemporary critics as an expansion of the band's sound while repurposing their traditional post-punk sound. Critics have noted that tracks on the album touch on a range of genres including disco, dark wave, krautrock, and synth-pop. The album garnered critical acclaim.

All or Nothing was the final album released by the band before their breakup in 2025.

== Critical reception ==
Professional ratings
Aggregate scores
Source	Rating
Metacritic	78/100
Review scores
Source	Rating
AllMusic	3.5/5 stars
DIY	4/5 stars
Exclaim!	8/10
MusicOMH	4/5 stars
The Observer	3/5 stars
Pitchfork	7.8/10
Q	4/5 stars
The Skinny	3/5 stars
Uncut	4/5 stars

All or Nothing was well received by contemporary music critics. On review aggregator Metacritic, the album has an average rating of 78 out of 100 based on twelve critic reviews, indicating "generally favorable reviews".

== Track listing ==
No.	Title	Length
1.	"All or Nothing"	3:15
2.	"Initiative"	2:48
3.	"Follow Me"	3:07
4.	"No Apologies"	2:49
5.	"For Your Pleasure"	3:31
6.	"About You"	3:50
7.	"Lies"	2:59
8.	"Expert Advice"	2:57
9.	"Body Clock"	2:21
10.	"Trust in Us"	2:55
Total length:		30:54

== See also ==
- List of 2020 albums
