= Shift Work (band) =

- Origin: London, England
- Genres: Post-industrial, electronic, minimal techno, acid techno, acid house, experimental
- Years active: 2011–present
- Labels: Houndstooth, Optimo Music
- Members: Mark Harris; Johnny Rivo

Shift Work are a London-based live electronics band composed of Mark Harris and Johnny Rivo. Harris was previously a member of Factory Floor.

Shift Work are currently signed to Houndstooth.

== Discography ==
=== EPs ===
- "Scaled to Fit" 12" (2014), Optimo Music
- "Document II" 12" (2015), Houndstooth
- "HTH050: Various Artists – Tessellations (2016), Houndstooth
