= Andrew Fekete (artist) =

British-Hungarian artist, diarist, and poet

- Born: 1 May 1954; St Mary's Hospital, London, United Kingdom
- Died: 31 March 1986 (aged 31); St Mary's Hospital, London, United Kingdom
- Education: University of Liverpool, University of Westminster
- Known for: Painting, drawing, architectural design, poetry
- Notable work: Over 100 paintings and drawings, 50 volumes of diaries

Andrew Fekete (Hungarian: [ˈfɛkɛtɛ]; 1 May 1954 – 31 March 1986) was a British-Hungarian artist, diarist, and poet. Although initially trained as an architect, he produced over 100 works of art, influenced by movements as diverse as Cubism, Abstract Expressionism and Symbolism. A practising Jungian alchemist, Fekete believed his art was a form of self-therapy for the mental illness with which he struggled his entire life. Alongside his visual art, Fekete kept extensive illustrated diaries which included numerous poems, essays and novellas, dealing with subjects ranging from art history and mythology to theosophy and mysticism.

== Early life ==
Andrew Julian Fekete was born at St Mary's Hospital, Paddington, London on 1 May 1954. His parents, Andrew Fekete, and Elizabeth née Szeleczky, were displaced people at the end of the Second World War, coming to the UK as refugees under the official Resettlement Programmes; first his mother in 1947, followed by his father a year later in 1948. The Fekete family originates from Transylvania, while the Szeleczky family trace their origins to the Alfold plain of Hungary. After escaping from Hungary during the period of the Stalinist regime of Mátyás Rákosi, Andrew's father became a successful restaurateur in the West End of London, while his mother trained as a nurse. After the birth of his brother Peter in 1958 and his sister Elizabeth in 1959, Andrew's mother returned to work as a night-sister at a hospital in Croydon.

Fekete's early years were set against a background of strong Hungarian identity. His parents were closely connected to the Hungarian National Club, at that time based in St John's Wood, and the family initially shared a house with an elderly Hungarian couple in Streatham. The family also had a mixed religious background; his mother was a Roman Catholic, whilst his father's family were strongly associated with the Translyvanian Unitarian Church. Both nationalist and religious influences were muted once the family moved to Thornton Heath, South London- although initially raised bilingual, Fekete appeared to have forgotten Hungarian as he matured.

Fekete attended David Livingstone Primary School from 1959 to 1966 where he was a popular pupil and the family entered fully into the local school community. Subsequently, Fekete attended Selhurst Grammar School, where Fekete's burgeoning sense of individualism appears to have left him relatively isolated. It was during his middle years at Selhurst that he began to develop awareness of his homosexual identity, and on account of this appears to have suffered from bullying.

Fekete's immersion in art began at an early stage. His mother used to take the children on family outings, and they visited all the museums, galleries and stately homes within reach by coach of the family house in South London. His mother- who, like Fekete had a talent for drawing and design- was also a skilled dress-maker. During his secondary school years Fekete developed the custom of going for very long walks, and also to traveling into London on his own to visit museums, galleries and to study the streets and their buildings. He became immersed in architecture, making designs for houses, and from an early age he chose architecture as his vocation. Fekete was also introduced to Modernist literature by one of his school masters, and it was there that he developed a fondness for the poetry of T.S. Eliot. He started writing his own poetry while still at school. He kept a diary almost continuously from the age of 16, and fifty of these diaries have survived his death. It is within these diaries that he began to record his visionary experiences from childhood.

== Training ==
Fekete was accepted to Jesus College, Cambridge to study Architecture, but narrowly failed to make the required grades, owing to his weaker Mathematics. He matriculated to the University of Liverpool to study Architecture, where the faculty was under the direction of Professor John Tarn. Fekete studied at Liverpool between September 1972 and June 1974. Alongside his studies, it was during these formative years in Liverpool that Fekete began to paint in earnest; perhaps the most significant work of this period were the preparatory sketches for the large canvas ‘It Jives’.

In early 1976, Fekete experienced a crisis, possibly connected with his sexuality, and was placed on a course of tranquilizers by a University doctor. This would mark the first official recognition of the lifelong struggle with mental illness he endured his entire life. In June 1976 Fekete failed the engineering sections of his second year examinations, and, rather than returning to London, he chose to go to Italy, before eventually returning to the family home in South London. He chose not to resume his studies at Liverpool, and started working as a telex operator, and redactor of news for various agencies in North London. During this time, his mother began divorce proceedings; his father left the house in June 1975 and the decree nisi came in 1976. Fekete became increasingly focused on his painting, attending evening class and took an A level in History of Art. Through his father, Andrew became friendly with Dame Elizabeth Frink, who encouraged him in his artistic endeavours.

== Career ==
Two of Fekete's works were accepted for the Summer Show of the Royal Academy in 1976 (Convergence, Pyrimidal Composition). Together with a friend of his from Liverpool days, Andrew joined an architectural pressure group called the New Architectural Movement (NAM). It is from this time that Andrew started to immerse himself in the study of Freud and particularly Jung, and his writings on architecture began to exhibit psychoanalytic influences. From September 1976 to June 1977 Fekete studied at the Central Polytechnic in London (now Westminster University), where he repeated successfully his second year in architecture. Lack of finance prohibited him from completing the third year and obtaining an undergraduate degree, however, he formed close connections during his time there, including associates who would go on to be Professors of Architecture at Liverpool John Moore's University and McGill University.

Around this time Fekete began exploring the gay scene of London, frequenting many of the clubs in Soho and making new friendships. He found work with a news agency, which provided him with a period of stable income. The divorce between his parents being effected, his father remarried, and, accepting an invitation to stay with them at their flat in Bayswater, he completed It Jives, the designs for which were started during his Liverpool days. The artist's so called ‘Monochrome period’ (see below) also began while living with his father. He subsequently moved back to his mother's house and began work on a novel called Aaron, the manuscript of which has been lost.

Moving out of his mother's in August, Fekete continued to be active within London's gay scene, where he met a number of like-minded individuals sharing his interest in Jungian psychology and analysis. It was during this period that he began his experiment in regaining the visionary experiences of his infancy; this experiment is described in his retrospective autobiographical essay The Voyage into Night, as well as in a more direct way in his surviving diaries. Fekete started to experience intense visions, which include three visions of the Buddha that are described in his diaries and his autobiographical novel, The Quest for Gold. His dream life was also intense, and he began to have what he called conjunctio experiences; though the precise nature of these events is a matter of interpretation, they are described as at once disturbing and elevating. In his art, he emerged from his Monochrome period into a style that he called "Lyrical Abstract Expressionism".

Leaving the news agency in 1980 due to personal disagreements, he obtained temporary work with an architectural practice, Grogan Associates. By 1982, Fekete's work with Grogan Associates assumed a more permanent characteristic, and Andrew started working with them on a number of projects and, in particular, competition entries. Fekete contributed significantly to the designs of all of these projects, including their competition entries for the redevelopment of Whiteleys (London Town Square) in Bayswater, and for the Extension to the National Gallery. Fekete also met and worked with SOM architect Bruce Graham during this period. The intensity of the architectural work prevented Fekete from further painting. However, it was during this time that he wrote The Quest for Gold (September 1982 to March 1983) based on autobiographical experiences connected with his friends and acquaintances in London.

== Death ==
In January 1984 Fekete resigned from Grogan Associates, initiating what can be understood as the final period of his life, marked by financial and personal distress. During this time the prime focus of his creative life shifted to his poetry. He also started a "city survey": a preparation to further development projects which he made as he walked around the city of London taking notes on every new building site. He began by drawing on family and friends for funds in order to meet obligations. It also appears that Fekete was intending to train as a Jungian analyst during this period, though financial and eventually physical constraints prevented him from doing so.

His financial difficulties intensified over Christmas 1984; however, he refused to participate in the family gathering, but rather remained alone in bed and breakfast accommodation. In February 1984 he staged an attempted suicide, and as a result his siblings arranged for him to return to his mother, who had by this time moved to Streatham. Supported by his mother, Fekete resumed his creative projects, writing and arranging his poetry, working on a photographic record of all the buildings in London designed by Hawksmoor. He wrote his essay Symbols of Creation and Destruction, in response to Jung's Symbols of Transformation. He started visiting the clinic at St. Mary's Hospital, Paddington, where he was eventually diagnosed as HIV positive. He became convinced that the drug that he was being prescribed, Ketoconazole, was causing hallucinations. On March 6, 1986 he voluntarily admitted himself to St. Mary's Hospital for psychological assessment. The following day he underwent respiratory failure and collapsed. He was placed on a life-support machine. He died on March 31, 1986, having briefly regained consciousness. His mother was in attendance.

== Influences, style & method ==
As one critic has pointed out, despite Fekete's work being produced in the seventies and eighties, it shares much more affinity with the genesis of twentieth-century painting. Many of his early paintings directly reference the Cubist movement in some way (Dunes—Cubism and the Curve reconciled (1972), Cubist Exercise: Tonal Diffusion (1973) for example). However, much of what Fekete refers to in his earlier paintings as Cubism actually might owe more to Orphists such as Robert and Sonia Delaunay, with their bright colours and swirling patterns. Given Fekete's strong Eastern European roots, one might also look to the various members of the Russian Avant-Garde for his inspiration. A number of the earlier ‘Cubist’ compositions share some similarities with Rodchenko's Constructivism, while his later mystical landscapes, with their numerous hidden faces are strangely analogous to Pavel Filonov's disturbing abstractions.

Some of Fekete's sketches from the Monochrome period (Sentinel, The New Gate to the Gunnery are reminiscent of M. C. Escher's non-Euclidean geometric universe, but also share some of the architectural and sculptural sensibilities of van Doesburg's and van’t Hoff's Neoplasticism. Of course, the difference between these artist's work and Fekete's is that his was done in trance-like states, induced by deliberately refraining from sleep for weeks on end. As such, not all these automatic drawings feature the same clean lines. Writing of this method, Fekete said, "Absent-mindedly, I always drew little scribbles in notebooks, elaborate doodles which were given little conscious thought but which on later inspection proved to be beautifully ordered."

A number of references to the Symbolist painter Arnold Bocklin, in particular his painting The Isle of the Dead, can be found within The Quest for Gold. If one were to speculate, we might wish to link the composition and theme of The Gateway to the City of the Scream to Bocklin's masterpiece.

Seeing as Fekte dubbed his later abstract pieces ‘Lyrical Abstract Expressionism’ we can only assume that he took something, if only as a starting point from the Germans, Russians and Americans who championed Abstract Expressionism. In truth though, his compositions resemble their work less visually than they do thematically. Like Rothko, Klee and Kandinsky before him, Fekete's paintings were interested in penetrating to the mystical heart of human experience; like these artists, Fekete viewed his painting primarily as a spiritual activity.

The majority of Fekete's work are rendered in oil on paper and are remarkably small in size. There are a few exceptions; Pyramidal Composition is watercolour whilst Fekete's earliest surviving work, Cubist Study, is rendered in Tempera. The Monochrome sketches are, of course, pencil or graphite on paper, whilst many of his architectural pieces were drawn free-hand with nothing more than black biro.

== Reception and legacy ==
=== Critical reception ===
Due to Fekete's fairly limited circulation outside of specialist circles, he has not garnered extensive critical attention. However, art historians and critics who have encountered his work have reflected positively on his work. Julia Carter has remarked on the artist's similarity to a number of artists associated with the German Blaue Reiter, while Zsuzanna Benko has noted the "increasingly organic, rounded motifs" as he moved away from his early Cubism.

=== Exhibitions ===
There have been three exhibitions of Fekete's work in Hungary:

- Andrew Fekete: A Retrospective, Székesfehérvar, 2013
- Alchemy Into Art: Andrew Fekete, 1979-1983, Hungarian National Dance Theatre, Budapest Castle, January 2014
- Andrew Fekete, Berekai Art Studio, Budapest, October 2015

2016 saw Fekete's first major exhibition in the UK, hosted in the museum of his alma mater, the Victoria Gallery & Museum, University of Liverpool. The exhibition, entitled Out of Time: Andrew Fekete 1979–1983, is the largest exhibition of his work so far and displayed never before seen works from the artist. It was curated by University of Liverpool staff in partnership with the University's Department of English, with support from Liverpool's Homotopia Arts Festival. Alongside the exhibition, the University is running a number of special events, including a symposium of LGBTQ issues, dramatised readings from The Quest for Gold and numerous public lectures that will run throughout the exhibition's lifespan. The exhibition opens November 17, 2016 and will run until April 2017.

== Works and publications ==
Published works:

- The Quest for Gold, Liverpool University Press, Liverpool: 2016 (Available for Purchase here via Liverpool University Press) Includes:
  - The Voyage into Night (1979)
  - The Magic Mountain (1979)
  - The Quest for Gold (1982-3)
  - Selected Diary Entries from 1982-3
  - Punishment for the Transgressors (1984)
  - Symbols of Creation and Destruction (1984)

Unpublished/lost works include:

- Diaries 1970-1986 (50 volumes)
- Poems 1970-1986
- Aaron: A Novel (1978, lost)
- The Alberto Papers: Freudian and Jungian Psychology and the New Rational Synthesis (1978)
- The Antinomian Divide (1979, lost)
- Journal of Active Imagination & Xanthis (1984)
