= László Fekete =

László Fekete is the name of:

- László Fekete (footballer) (1954–2014), Hungarian footballer
- László Fekete (strongman) (born 1958), Hungarian strongman
