= Cheryl (artist collective) =

Cheryl was a four-member, semi-anonymous, cat-masked artist collective based in Brooklyn, New York, known for its video art, museum installations, participatory events and dance parties. Cheryl originated in July 2008 in the Park Slope neighborhood of Brooklyn. Since then, Cheryl regularly produced thematic art/performance/dance events and installations in New York and in Europe until 2018, when they went on hiatus. They returned with two parties at Rubulad in 2024. No future events are scheduled at this time.

Cheryl was best known for its thematic video work, often paired with an upcoming event of the same theme. Cheryl's work has been showcased through various installations and events with the Museum of Modern Art, MoMA PS1, the Whitney Museum of American Art, the Brooklyn Museum, Palazzo Strozzi, the Jewish Museum (New York), and the Bruce High Quality Foundation among others.

Cheryl has been featured in/on The New York Times, New York magazine, The New York Observer, Out magazine, V, W, Time Out, Black Book magazine, The Village Voice, Flavor magazine (Paris), Glamour (France), NBC and RAI among other outlets.

== The Cheryl blurb ==
Cheryl is an artist collective that explores the themes of mortality, mania, the feline-human connection, the limits of shoulders, the flammability of dollar-store hair extensions, and the staining power of fake blood. Through themes ranging from topical to bizarre, the CHERYLs revel in the joyous power of dance-induced psychosis/euphoria. Cheryl has been bringing its particular brand of FRESHMAGICK to New York City since colonial times, and has since acquired a dedicated cult following and media attention for over-the-top happenings involving outrageous costumes, exuberant dance moves, and participatory dance floor suicide.

The four elements of CHERYL are fake blood, glitter, shoulder pads, and hair extensions.
