= Lantern Theatre =

Theatre in Philadelphia

Coordinates: 53.3651°N 1.4860°W

The Lantern Theatre (originally called The Chalet Theatre) is a small Sheffield theatre (seating capacity 84) built in 1893 and is Sheffield's oldest theatre. The Lantern Theatre is a former professional theatre venue and arts centre that houses small and mid-scale theatre, music, and comedy.

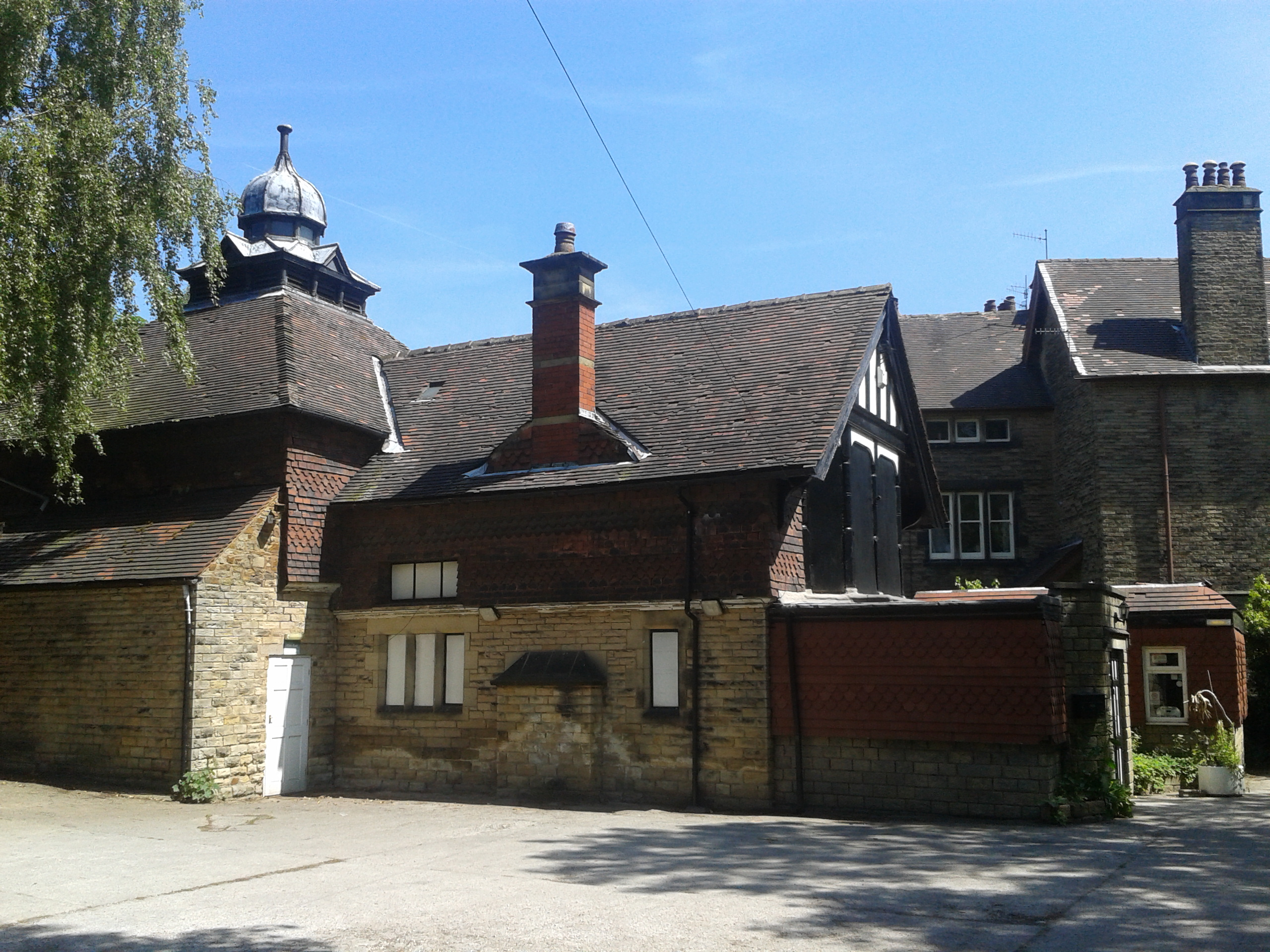
The theatre, in 2013

In 2011 the theatre produced their first professional co-production and in 2012 are producing their first in-house professional production of Order, a play by Martin Derbyshire. In 2012 Ruth Carney replaced Martin Derbyshire as artistic director only to leave after one season at the helm. The theatre no longer has an artistic team and is an amateur-run receiving venue run by a general manager.

The theatre is situated in the residential area of Nether Edge, England. It was originally the personal theatre of a local industrialist, however it fell into disrepair after his death. It was restored as a theatre in 1957 by Dilys Guite. The Theatre was used almost exclusively by the Dilys Guite Players (who own the theatre) for the first forty years but since then the theatre has been hired out by the players and used by a number of groups, bands and companies.
