= FACT Liverpool =

New media arts centre in Liverpool

Coordinates: 53°24′08″N 2°58′40″W

FACT
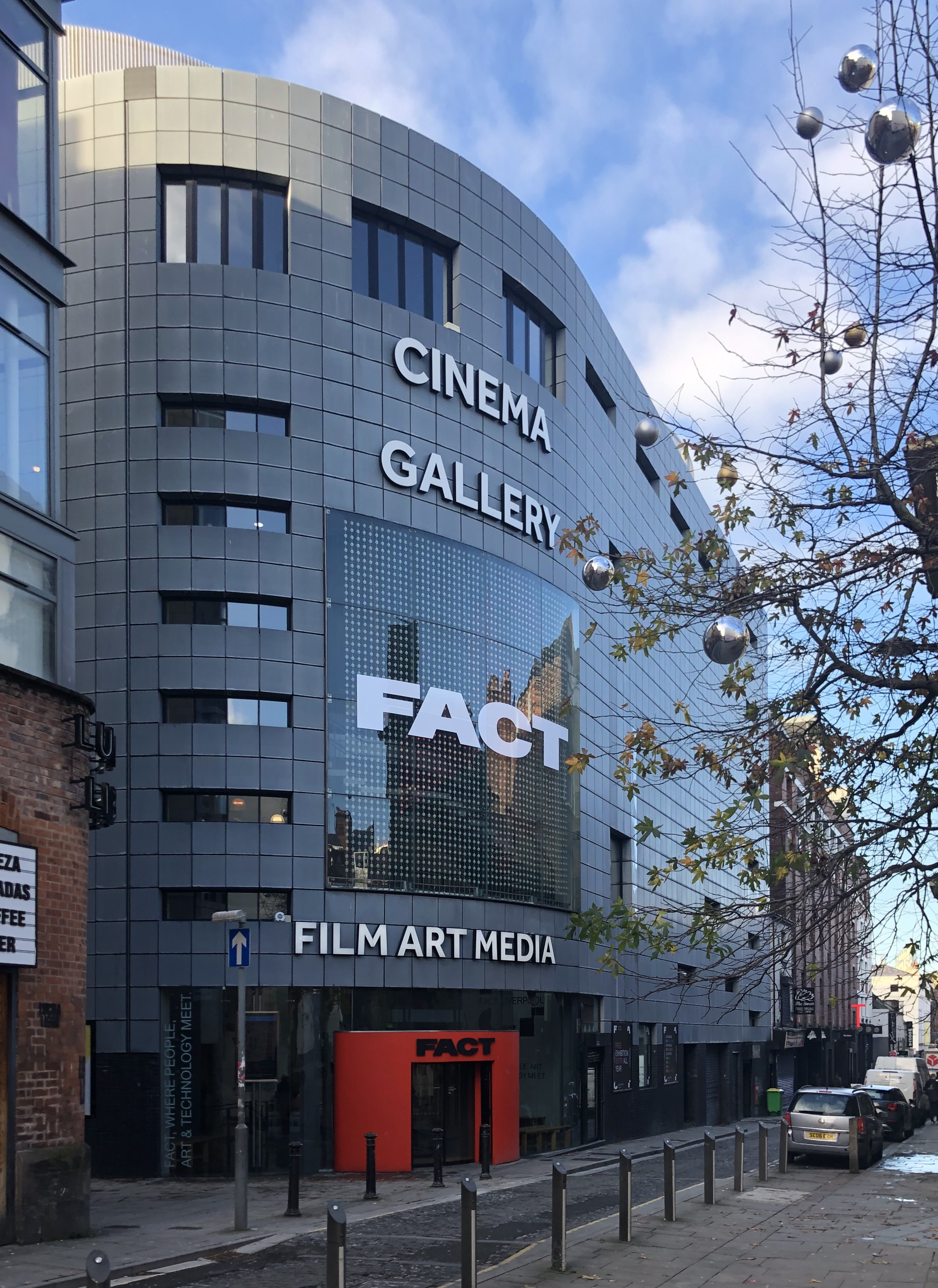
- Exterior of FACT
- Interactive map of the FACT area

General information
- Location: 88 Wood Street, Liverpool, England
- Opened: 2003

Website
- www.fact.co.uk

FACT Liverpool is a new media arts centre in Liverpool, England. The building houses galleries, a cinema operated by Picturehouse, a bar, and a café.

== History ==
FACT was established as an organisation focussed on video and new media art, exhibiting and curating the work of artists that had little platform in the UK. Among those behind its foundation was Graeme Phillips.

FACT was designed by architectural firm Austin-Smith:Lord. When FACT first opened in 2003, it was Liverpool's first new arts building in over 60 years, since the opening of the Liverpool Philharmonic Hall over 60 years prior. FACT is an exhibitor and producer of video and digital art, and had its 15th birthday in 2018.

FACT's first exhibition, Isaac Julien’s Baltimore, was commissioned for the opening of the building and continued to tour for the next decade. Since then, FACT has presented over 350 new media and digital artworks from artists including Pipilotti Rist, Nam June Paik, Haroon Mirza, Agnès Varda, Wu Tsang, Apichatpong Weerasethakul, and Chila Kumari Burman.

== Exhibitions and events ==
FACT supports, produces and presents visual art that includes creative media and digital technology. In 2007 Picturehouse at FACT hosted a Question and Answer session with Quentin Tarantino for the UK release of Death Proof. In 2015 as part of an exhibition named Follow, FACT exhibited an artwork in which Shia LaBeouf answered phone calls from the public. In 2017, Picturehouse at FACT hosted the world premiere of Kenny, a documentary film about former Liverpool FC player and manager Kenny Dalglish.

FACT is a partner venue of Liverpool Biennial and showed works by Agnes Varda and Mohamed Bourouissa for the 2018 edition. Also in 2018, FACT commissioned the immersive art installation AURORA at Toxteth Reservoir with artists Invisible Flock, and exhibited Broken Symmetries, an international exhibition co-produced by FACT, Arts at CERN, CCCB, Barcelona, Le Lieu unique, Nantes and iMAL, Brussels.

== See also ==
- Culture of Liverpool
- Contemporary art
- RopeWalks, Liverpool
- National Science and Media Museum
- The Bluecoat
