= Shopping (band) =

British post-punk band

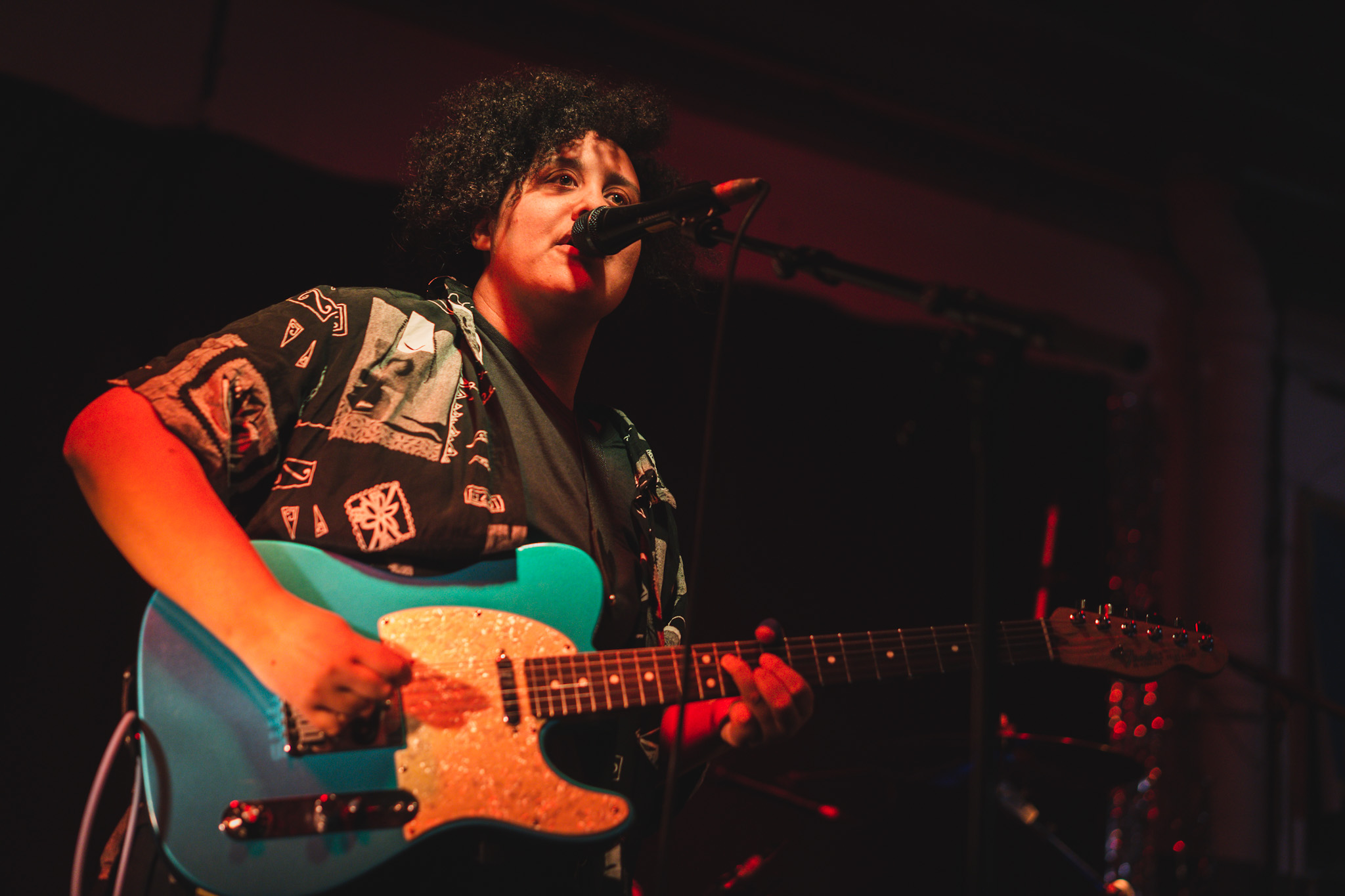
- Ray Aggs in 2020

Background information
- Origin: London, England
- Genre: Post-punk
- Years active: 2012–2025
- Labels: Mïlk Records; FatCat Records
- Past members: Ray Aggs; Billy Easter; Andrew Milk

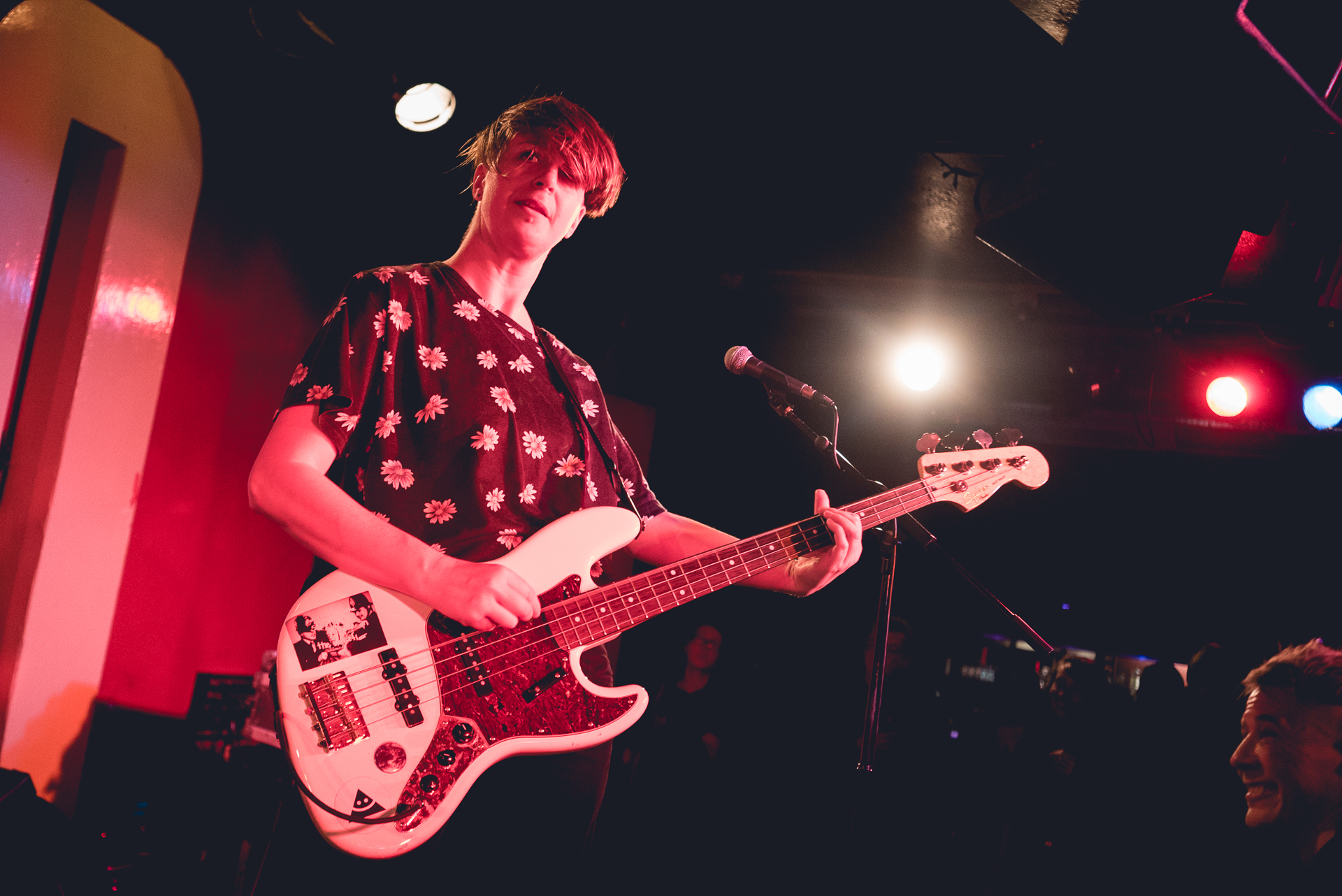
Billy Easter in 2015

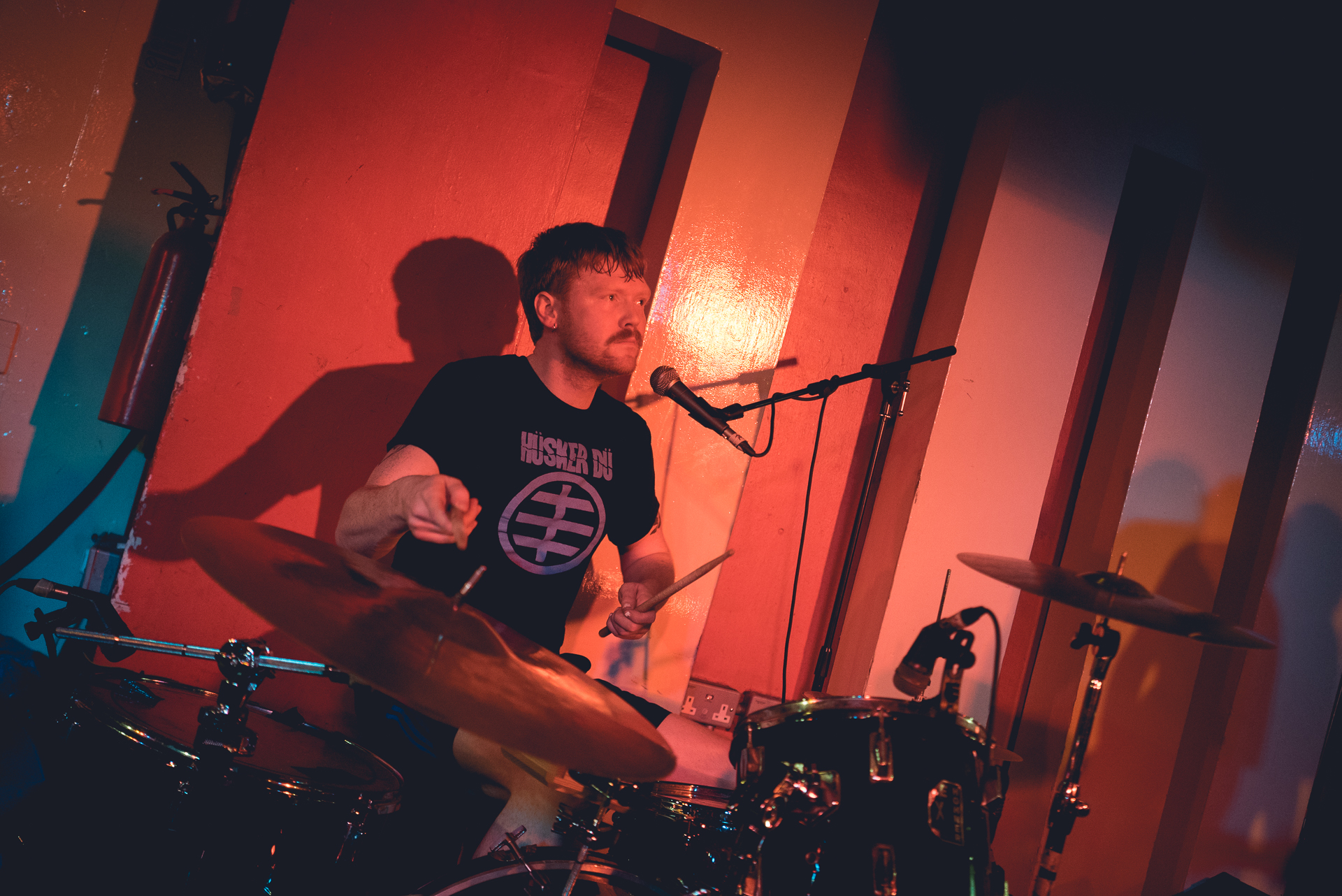
Andrew Milk in 2015

Shopping was a British post-punk trio based in London and Glasgow. The group formed in 2012 and consisted of Ray Aggs (guitar and vocals), Billy Easter (bass guitar and vocals), and Andrew Milk (drums and vocals). They released four albums on independent record labels; Consumer Complaints (2013), Why Choose (2015), The Official Body (2018), and All or Nothing (2020). They disbanded with a final single in 2025.

== History ==
Ray Aggs (guitar and vocals), Billy Easter (bass guitar and vocals), and Andrew Milk (drums and vocals), started the band in November 2012 out of their previous band, Covergirl. Shopping released their debut single "In Other Words", recorded at their rehearsal space Power Lunches, in 2013. This was followed by a European tour.

Later that year, the band released its debut album, Consumer Complaints, on Mïlk Records, a record label run by Easter and Milk. The album was compared to bands like ESG, Delta 5, Talking Heads, and Gang of Four. Consumer Complaints was released in the U.S. by FatCat Records in 2015; later that year, Shopping's second album, Why Choose, arrived via FatCat Records.

Following the second album's release, the band's rehearsal space, Power Lunches, shut down and Milk moved to Glasgow. Shopping adapted, recording their third album, The Official Body, with Edwyn Collins at his Clashnarrow studio in the Scottish Highlands. The album was released on 19 January 2018.

On 5 December 2019 they announced their fourth album All or Nothing, which was released on 7 February 2020. It was recorded over a 10 day period in London with US based producer, Davey Warsop.

On 15 August 2025, Shopping announced that they had broken up. A week later, on 22 August, they released their final single "White Noise" alongside a music video.

== Discography ==
=== Albums ===
- Consumer Complaints - Mïlk Records/ FatCat Records, 12" LP, CD, MP3 (2013)
- Why Choose - FatCat Records, 12" LP, CD, MP3 (2015)
- The Official Body - FatCat Records, 12" LP, CD, MP3 (2018)
- All or Nothing - FatCat Records, 12" LP, CD, MP3 (2020)

=== Extended plays ===
- Unexpected Item - FatCat Records Limited Edition 12" LP, MP3 Remix EP feat remixes by Carson Cox, Helm, Ela Orleans, Knit Mitten & Apostille

=== Singles ===
- "In Other Words" - Mïlk Records, 7" single (2013)
- "Straight Lines" - FatCat Records, 7" single, MP3 (2015)
- "Take It Outside" - FatCat Records, MP3 (2016)
- "Why Wait" - FatCat Records, MP3 (2016)
- "The Hype" - FatCat Records, MP3 (2017)
- "Wild Child" - FatCat Records, MP3 (2018)
- "Initiative" - FatCat Records, MP3 (2020)
- "For Your Pleasure" - FatCat Records, MP3 (2020)
- "White Noise" (2025)
