= Unity Theatre, Liverpool =

Theatre in Liverpool, England

Coordinates: 53.401°N 2.972°W

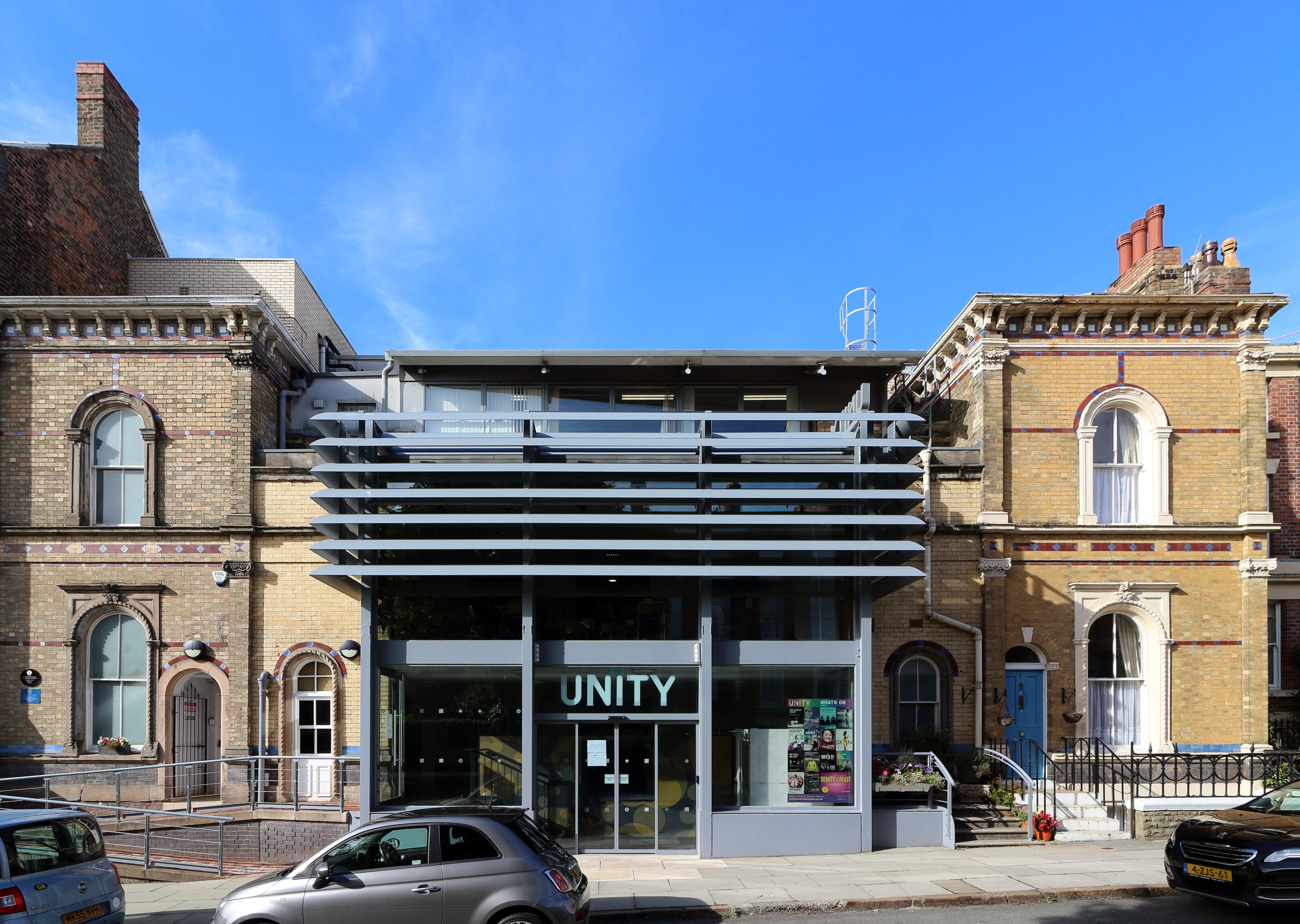
The entrance on Hope Place

The Unity Theatre is a theatre in Liverpool, England.

Formed by directors Gerry Dawson and Edgar Criddle as the Merseyside Left Theatre in the 1930s, the theatre became known as the Merseyside Unity Theatre in 1944. The company was known for being radical and experimentalist, staging classics alongside contemporary left-wing theatre; an aim was to make theatre accessible to the working class. Its first artistic director was Graeme Phillips, for 33 years until 2015. He also served as theatre director until his death in 2025.

Today, the theatre provides workshops and performance space and is based in a converted synagogue (the former home of Liverpool Reform Synagogue) on Hope Place off Hope Street.
