= Islington Mill =

Georgian mill building in Salford, England

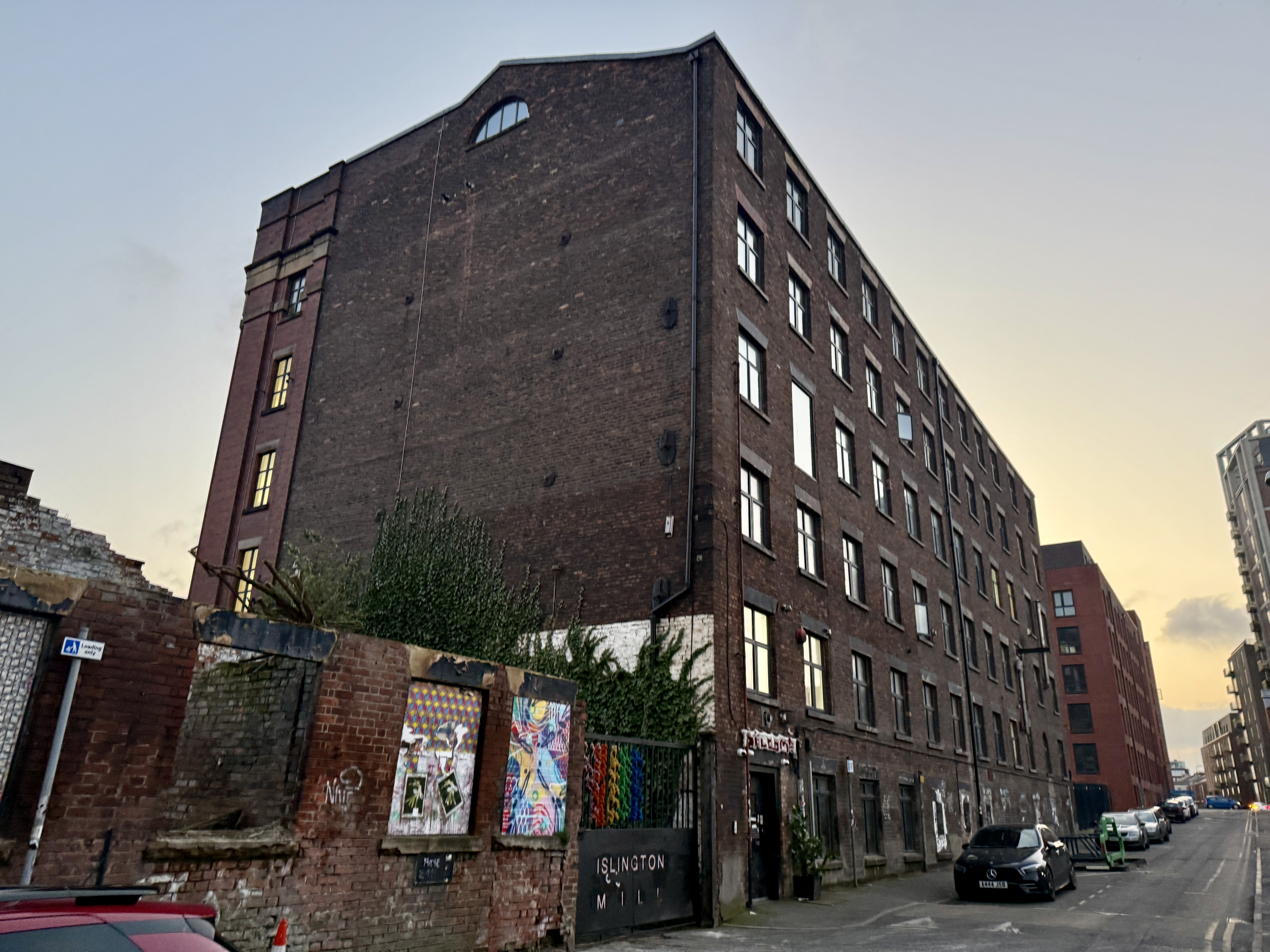
- Islington Mill in Salford, United Kingdom in March 2025

- Location in Greater Manchester
- Architectural style: Georgian
- Location: James Street, Ordsall, Salford, England
- Owner: Bill Campbell
- Coordinates: 53.48185°N 2.26339°W

Construction
- Built: 1823
- Floor count: 6

Design team
- Architect: David Bellhouse

Equipment

Listed Building – Grade II
- Official name: Islington Mill, Including Engine and Boiler Houses, Warehouse and Stabling
- Designated: 4 November 1996
- Reference no.: 1386142

Islington Mill is a Grade II listed, six-storey Georgian mill building located at 1 James Street in Ordsall, Salford, England. Originally constructed in 1823 for cotton spinning by architect David Bellhouse, the term "Islington Mill" refers to both the original 19th-century building complex and the Islington Mill Arts Club, an independent arts venue and creative community housed within the site.

Following its initial industrial use and eventual disuse, artist Bill Campbell leased space in the mill in 1996 and subsequently purchased the freehold, converting the complex into an arts hub comprising studios, exhibition spaces, live-work quarters, and performance venues. The site hosts the annual Sounds from the Other City music festival and has undergone major capital restoration funded by Arts Council England, the National Lottery Heritage Fund, and the European Regional Development Fund.

== Architecture ==
Islington Mill was originally built for cotton spinning in 1823 by the self-taught Leeds-born architect David Bellhouse (1764–1840). Bellhouse's firm was also responsible for the construction of Manchester's Portico Library, of which Bellhouse was also a founding member, and the original Manchester Town Hall on King Street, designed by Francis Goodwin and later demolished.

A year after the original construction of Islington Mill, there was a partial structural collapse of the building. During rebuilding, various new structures were added to the original model that had consisted of a single row of cast-iron columns. Further extensions were subsequently added over the years, including a second mill (which was also later rebuilt), stables around the courtyard and an external engine house. By the early 1900s, the mill was being used for textile doubling rather than spinning.

Islington Mill was granted a Grade II listing by English Heritage in November 1996, with the listed building ID number 471566.

== Islington Mill Arts Club ==
In 1996, Bill Campbell took a lease on a single floor of the mill. The upper storeys of the main mill had by this time been out of use for around 30 years. After a nine-month occupancy by Campbell, Islington Mill was put up for sale by the owners, and Campbell successfully raised funds to purchase it. The first art exhibitions took place at the mill in 1999, with Campbell acquiring the freehold on the remainder of the building the following year. Since then, the interiors of the buildings have been gradually renovated and converted for multiple uses, including the conversion of the engine house into living space, by Campbell and architect David Britch. The Engine House now houses design studios and is also the name of the creative collective who operate from there.

Islington Mill operates as an independent arts venue under the name Islington Mill Arts Club.

The present day structure of Islington Mill Arts Club is a multi-purpose, multi-occupancy collection of buildings, comprising numerous artist studios, educational spaces and galleries, as well as living accommodation, event and performance spaces, administrative offices, and studio and work spaces for a range of independently operated art, design and craft ventures.

There are currently four Directors of the Mill: founder Bill Campbell, artist Maurice Carlin, artist Rachel Goodyear, and trainer/consultant, Rivca Rubin.

== Events and programming ==
Islington Mill functions as a cultural venue and workspace, hosting exhibitions, community workshops, and live performances. Since 2005, the site has served as the main hub for Sounds from the Other City (SFTOC), an annual music and arts festival held during the early May bank holiday weekend. The festival features line-ups organized by local independent concert promoters and has hosted early career performances by artists including Alt-J, Sampha, Marina, Slowthai, and Black Country, New Road. The event expands beyond the mill complex into nearby churches, venues, and public spaces across Salford.

== Renovation and development ==
In July 2014, Islington Mill announced a capital funding award from Arts Council England of £1 million as part of a £2.2 million project to secure the future of the venue. In December 2018, the site received further backing from the National Lottery Heritage Fund, securing a £746,000 grant award alongside financial contributions from Salford City Council and independent fundraising by resident artists. The total £7 million restoration project funded structural weatherproofing, replacement of the roof, installation of an exterior lift, and the conversion of 4,000 sq ft (370 m^{2}) of space across the fifth and sixth floors into new artist live-work and event facilities.

In September 2020, Islington Mill announced £3.3m in funding from the European Regional Development Fund to purchase and renovate the adjacent New Islington Mill building for artist studios, grants, and training programs. The adjacent industrial site, Regent Trading Estate, was incorporated into the complex under the designation "The Other City", named after the music festival hosted at the site.

Renovations to the main building commenced in November 2020. Educational and artist support initiatives were formally established under the Islington Mill Foundation, which operates as a registered charity (number 1185577).

== See also ==
- Listed buildings in Salford
