= Art Brut Top of the Pops =

Top of the Pops

Greatest hits album by Art Brut
- Released: 16 April 2013
- Genres: Indie rock, garage punk, garage rock
- Label: The End Records

Art Brut chronology
Brilliant! Tragic! (2011)	Top of the Pops (2013)	Wham! Bang! Pow! Let's Rock Out! (2018)

Professional ratings
Review scores
Source	Rating
We Hate Your Band	9/10 stars
Consequence of Sound	4/5 stars
The Bulletin	5/5 stars
The Line Of Best Fit	8/10 stars
Digital Spy	4/5 stars
AllMusic	4/5 stars
Pitchfork	6/10 stars

Art Brut Top of the Pops is a compilation album by the band Art Brut. As well as a 'best of' set, the two-disc collection includes two new songs, "Arizona Bay" and "We Make Pop Music", as well as B-sides, cover versions, demos and live material.

== Track listing ==
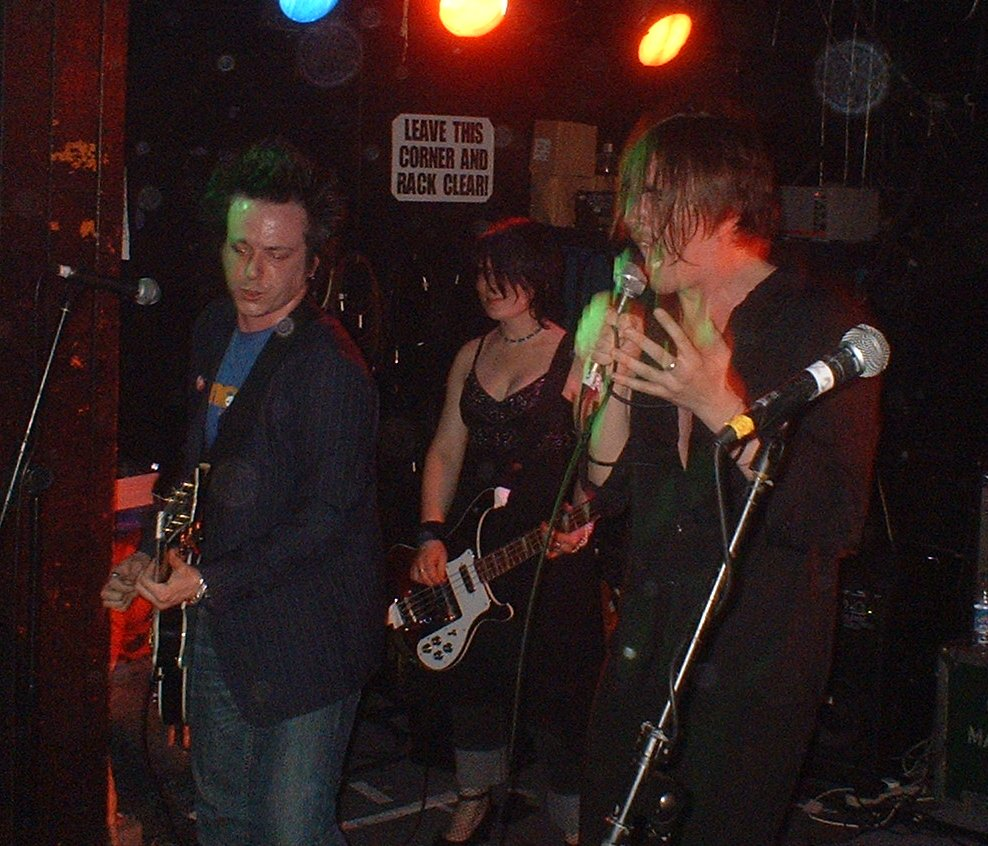
Art Brut commemorate their 10th anniversary with Top of the Pops, a double disc set

CD1 is a best of set, chronologically collecting highlights from band's back catalogue. It contains two brand new songs, 'Arizona Bay' and 'We Make Pop Music'.

No.	Title	Length
1.	"Formed a Band"	2:58
2.	"My Little Brother"	2:23
3.	"Emily Kane"	2:41
4.	"Modern Art"	2:23
5.	"Good Weekend"	2:49
6.	"Direct Hit!"	3:34
7.	"Nag Nag Nag Nag"	3:10
8.	"St Pauli"	2:58
9.	"Pump Up The Volume"	2:56
10.	"DC Comics and Chocolate Milkshake"	3:28
11.	"Alcoholics Unanimous"	3:36
12.	"Summer Job"	2:56
13.	"Demons Out!"	3:41
14.	"Axl Rose"	3:28
15.	"Sexy Sometimes"	3:32
16.	"Lost Weekend"	4:22
17.	"Sealand"	3:58
18.	"Arizona Bay"
19.	"We Make Pop Music"

- Tracks 1–5 from Bang Bang Rock & Roll, released by Rough Trade (2005)
- Tracks 6–9 from It's A Bit Complicated, released by EMI (2007)
- Tracks 10–13 from Art Brut vs Satan, released by Cooking Vinyl (2009)
- Tracks 14–17 from Brilliant! Tragic!, released by Cooking Vinyl (2011)

CD2 is a collection of b-sides, covers, live tracks and demos "that Freddy Feedback rescued" from the Art Brut vaults, including unreleased demos from the ‘Its A Bit Complicated’ recording sessions that took place with Pulp’s Russell Senior.

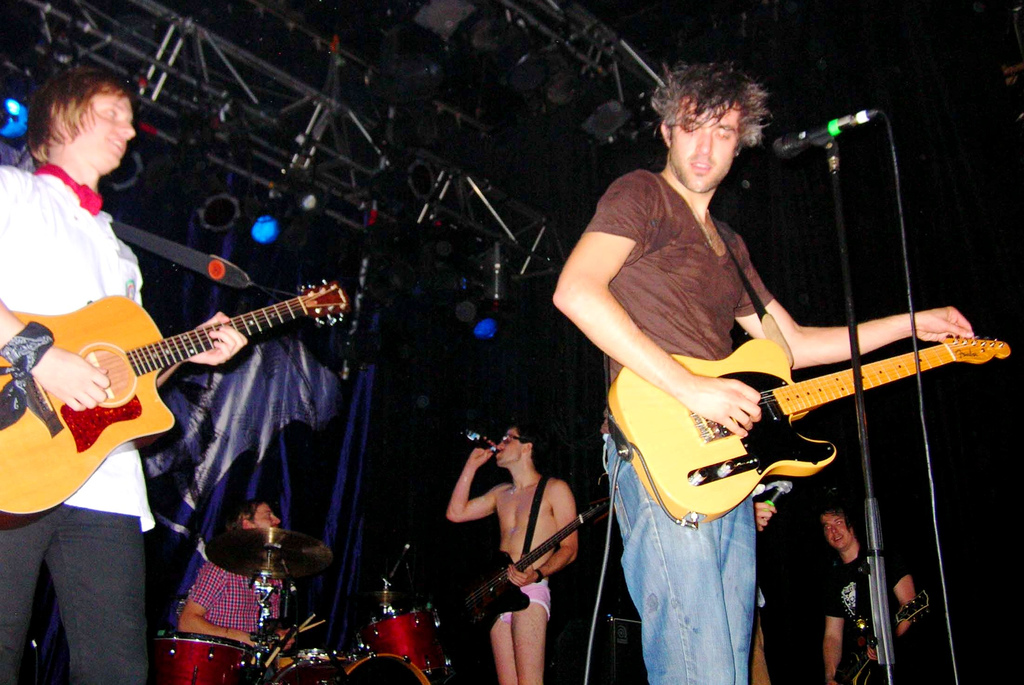
Art Brut cover The Great Escape by We are Scientists

No.	Title	Length
1.	"Formed a Band (early Keith Top of the Pops version)"
2.	"Bad Weekend (early Keith Top of the Pops version)"
3.	"These Animal Menswear"
4.	"Modern Art (early Keith Top of the Pops version)"
5.	"Maternity Ward"
6.	"Blame It on the Trains (produced by Russell Senior)"
7.	"Post Soothing Out (produced by Russell Senior)"
8.	"St Pauli (produced by Russell Senior)"
9.	"About Time"
10.	"Ignorance Is Bliss"
11.	"Catch (the Cure cover)"
12.	"Modern Art (recorded for Berlin Live)"
13.	"Just Desserts (alt. version)"
14.	"Moved to L.A."
15.	"Weird Science"
16.	"Positively 5th Street"
17.	"Unprofessional Wrestling"
18.	"The Great Escape"
19.	"Her Majesty"
20.	"Post Soothing Out (recorded for Berlin Live)"

== Credits ==
- Eddie Argos – vocals
- Chris Chinchilla – Guitar
- Ian Catskilkin – Guitar
- Jasper Future – Guitar
- Freddy Feedback – Bass guitar
- Mike Breyer – drums
