= Art Brut Live at Schubas 11/15/2005 =

Live at Schubas 11/15/2005

Live album by Art Brut
- Released: 15 November 2005
- Recorded: Schubas Tavern in Chicago, Illinois
- Genres: Indie rock Garage punk Garage rock
- Length: 48:32

Art Brut chronology
Bang Bang Rock & Roll (2005)	Live at Schubas 11/15/2005 (2005)	It's a Bit Complicated (2007)

Art Brut Live at Schubas 11/15/2005 is a live album by British indie rock group Art Brut. At present, it is only available in mp3 format. The album was recorded at Schubas Tavern in Chicago, Illinois, during the promotional tour for the band's first album. Although the majority of tracks on this live album are taken from Bang Bang Rock & Roll, it also contains early versions of St.Pauli and Blame It on the Trains, which later appear on the second Art Brut album It's A Bit Complicated.

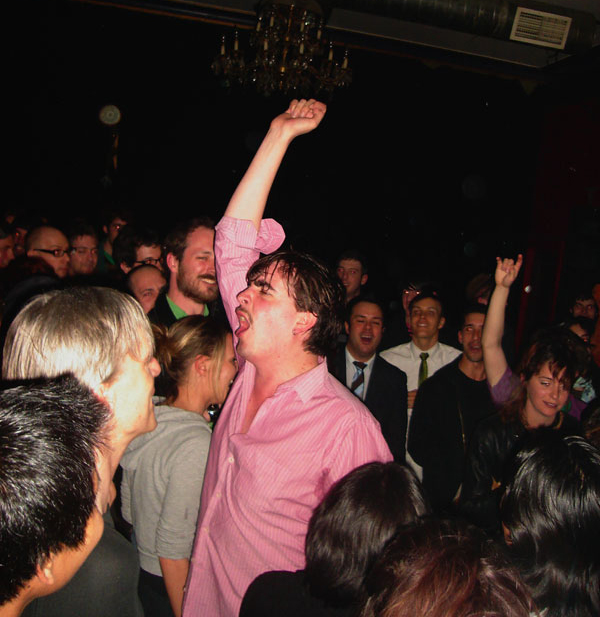

== Track listing ==
No.	Title	Length
1.	"Formed A Band"	4:09
2.	"My Little Brother"	3:42
3.	"St.Pauli"	4:48
4.	"Rusted Guns Of Milan"	4:00
5.	"Blame It on the Trains"	4:11
6.	"Modern Art"	3:14
7.	"Moving To LA"	4:11
8.	"Emily Kane"	3:23
9.	"Bad Weekend"	4:03
10.	"Good Weekend"	7:47
11.	"Bang Bang, Rock & Roll"	2:18
12.	"18,000 Lira"	2:46

== Credits ==
- Eddie Argos – vocals
- Ian Catskilkin – Guitar
- Chris Chinchilla – Guitar
- Freddy Feedback – Bass guitar
- Mike Breyer – drums
