= Brilliant! Tragic! =

Studio album by Art Brut
- Released: 23 May 2011
- Recorded: December 2010 at Wavelength Studios, Salem, Oregon
- Genres: Indie rock, garage rock, garage punk
- Labels: Cooking Vinyl, Downtown
- Producer: Frank Black

Art Brut chronology
Art Brut vs. Satan (2009)	Brilliant! Tragic! (2011)	Art Brut Top of the Pops (2013)

Singles from Brilliant! Tragic!
- 1. "Lost Weekend" Released: 16 May 2011; 2. "Clever, Clever Jazz" Released: 15 August 2011

Brilliant! Tragic! is the fourth studio album by Art Brut, released on 23 May 2011 through Cooking Vinyl in Europe, and 24 May 2011 through Downtown Records in the United States. The album was recorded in Salem, Oregon, and was the second by the band to be produced by Frank Black, best known as the frontman of Pixies. To accompany the album, a comic book version of Brilliant! Tragic! was released at the same time.

The track listing and release details were confirmed in early March 2011.

Art Brut frontman Eddie Argos described Brilliant! Tragic! as his "favourite" Art Brut album, saying that it was definitely their "greatest" album so far. "Bang Bang Rock & Roll did what it said on the tin", Argos explained, "It's A Bit Complicated was a bit complicated. On Art Brut vs. Satan we had to fight Satan. This one follows the same pattern, it is a 'brilliant, tragic', record. If it was a TV show you'd define it as a dramedy."

On the subject matter for the album, Argos said; "This time the album is more about how I think I'm psychic, songs for my funeral, the principality of Sealand and Axl Rose. Weightier topics I think. I'm also sexier now" He also comments on the band's current musical direction, stating that "with the last album we'd just remembered we were a punk band again so it was all four to the floor rock out. This time there are a few songs to let you catch your breath so when we do rock the fuck out again it hits home harder."

== Writing and recording ==
Describing the writing and recording of the album, Argos said, "with the last album we met up every couple of months and wrote three or four songs. This time we got together in the second half of the year and wrote whenever we could 2 or 3 times a week. We had more time in the studio this time too (about a week more) so Black Francis had time to teach me how to sing. I'm very proud that I sing on it. Only took four albums to start singing, not bad." Although Argos has said that it "feels good to find out my voice is an instrument", he found the process of learning to sing somewhat "scary". "The first song we did, we recorded all the music, and then Frank was like "Everybody go home, I'm talking to Eddie", and I was like "Oh no, what's he going to do to me?" It was a bit scary. We went in and spent hours really, getting me to sing. Once we sort of conquered that one — and he showed me that I could sing— it was a confidence boost. I've always been a bit scared of singing. It's funny, him (Frank Black) teaching me how to sing on the record. We'd play the song through, and he'd sing it, and then we'd do it again, and I'd sing. We'd either do it as a duet, or I'd copy him. If we'd just recorded him singing it and not me, we could have had a secret bonus album, but we didn't do that. But what a brilliant person to have teach you how to sing, you know, Black Francis from the Pixies. Yeah, it's pretty awesome".

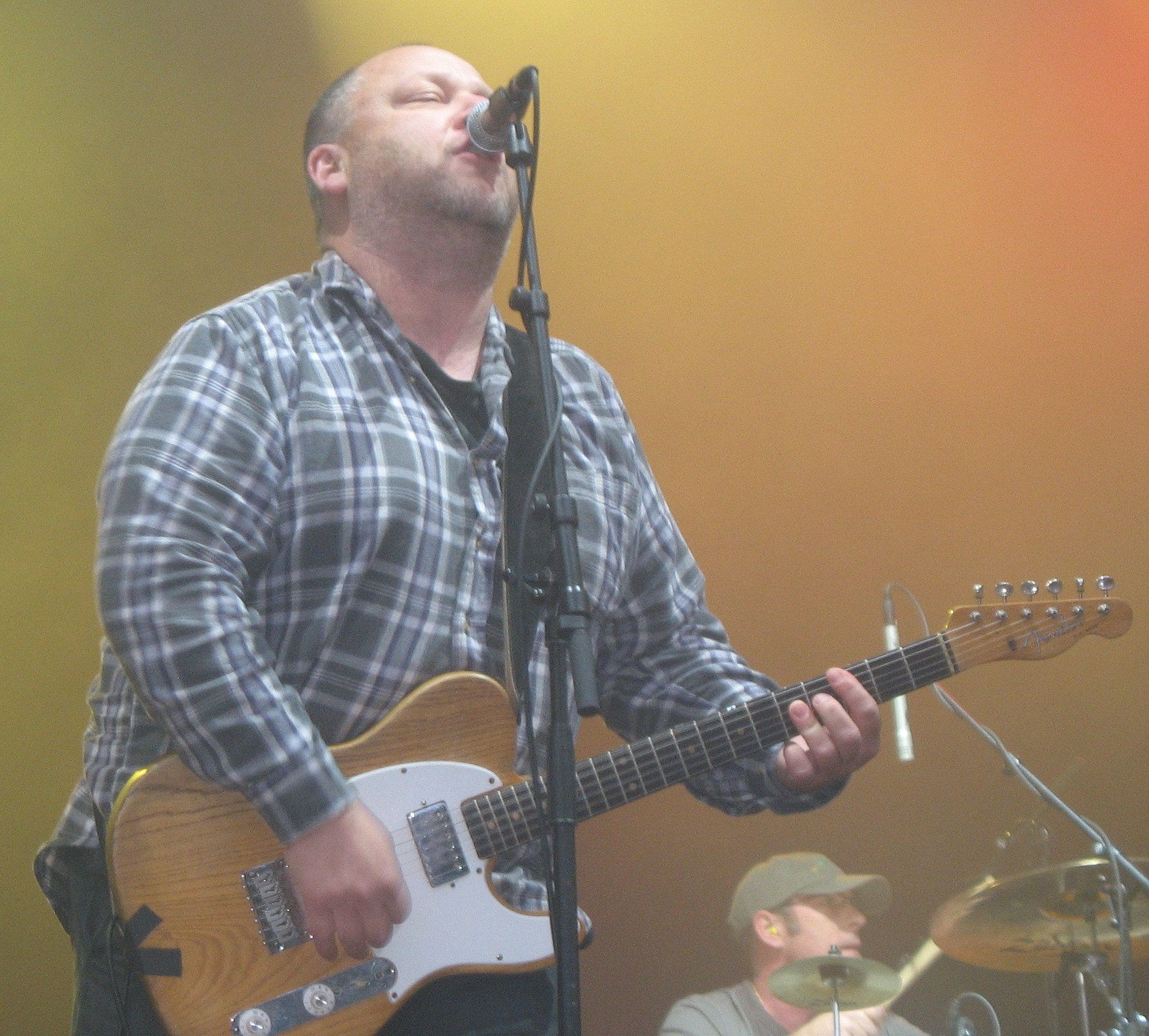
Producing for the second time, Frank Black

Argos was not the only Art Brut member singing for the first time on this album. Bassist Freddy Feedback also debuts her vocal skills, singing backing vocals for the first time. "Frank Black was saying how nice it would be if there was a female backing vocals", Argos says. "Freddy can be quite shy. She likes to be in the back, really. The plan is now to get her to do it live. I think she sounds quite lovely. When I heard her on the record, it was amazing. Maybe she should be the singer, I'll write the words. That's what we should probably do".

== Reception ==
Professional ratings
Review scores
Source	Rating
Crackle Feedback	8/10 stars
Uncut	4/5 stars
NME	6/10 stars
Mojo	4/5 stars
Rolling Stone	link
Consequence of Sound	3.5/5 stars
Slant Magazine	link
Spin	link
Drowned in Sound	link
Pitchfork	(5.5/10) link

The band aired the new material at several shows before the album's release, including the 10th birthday party of Islington's Buffalo Bar. The new material was described as "more adventurous" and "more varied than on previous albums", and was generally "well received", despite the fact that the audience was "not familiar with any of the material." One critic went so far as to say that "'Brilliant! Tragic!' may very well be the best Art Brut album yet" while another said that "it is the best thing they've done in half a decade." According to early reviews, "Bad Comedian", "Axl Rose" and "Ice Hockey" proved to be particular "crowd pleasers", with "Axl Rose" as main talking point in early reviews. According to one reviewer, "Axl Rose" "is an undeniable highlight, containing enough swearing to make it's [sic] namesake proud" while another says that the song boasts "some of the best swearing you'll ever hear!"

In the music press, the album received generally positive reviews. Writing for the May 2011 issue of Uncut magazine, for example, Stephen Dalton compared Argos' songwriting to that of Jarvis Cocker, Ian Dury, Mark E. Smith and Luke Haines, awarding the album a favourable 4/5. Mojo also awarded the album 4/5, praising Argos' improved "angsty bellow". In their 7/10 review of the album, Drowned in Sound said that while "the record is still unmistakably Art Brut, there's also much more progression and experimentation than we've seen from the band before", comparing "Is Dog Eared" to "PiL-era John Lydon". Alternative Press also compared Argos to the former Sex Pistols frontman in their review, saying that "Argos has channeled his inner Johnny Rotten, seemingly vacillating between contempt and boredom. Fortunately, the band play with a similar sense of toughened rawness". Rolling Stone awarded the album 3/5, but called it the group's "sturdiest album to date" NME awarded the album an average 6/10. Despite finding something "strangely self-conscious" about the album, the reviewer concluded by saying that she still loves them, despite their "eccentric faults".

== Song information ==
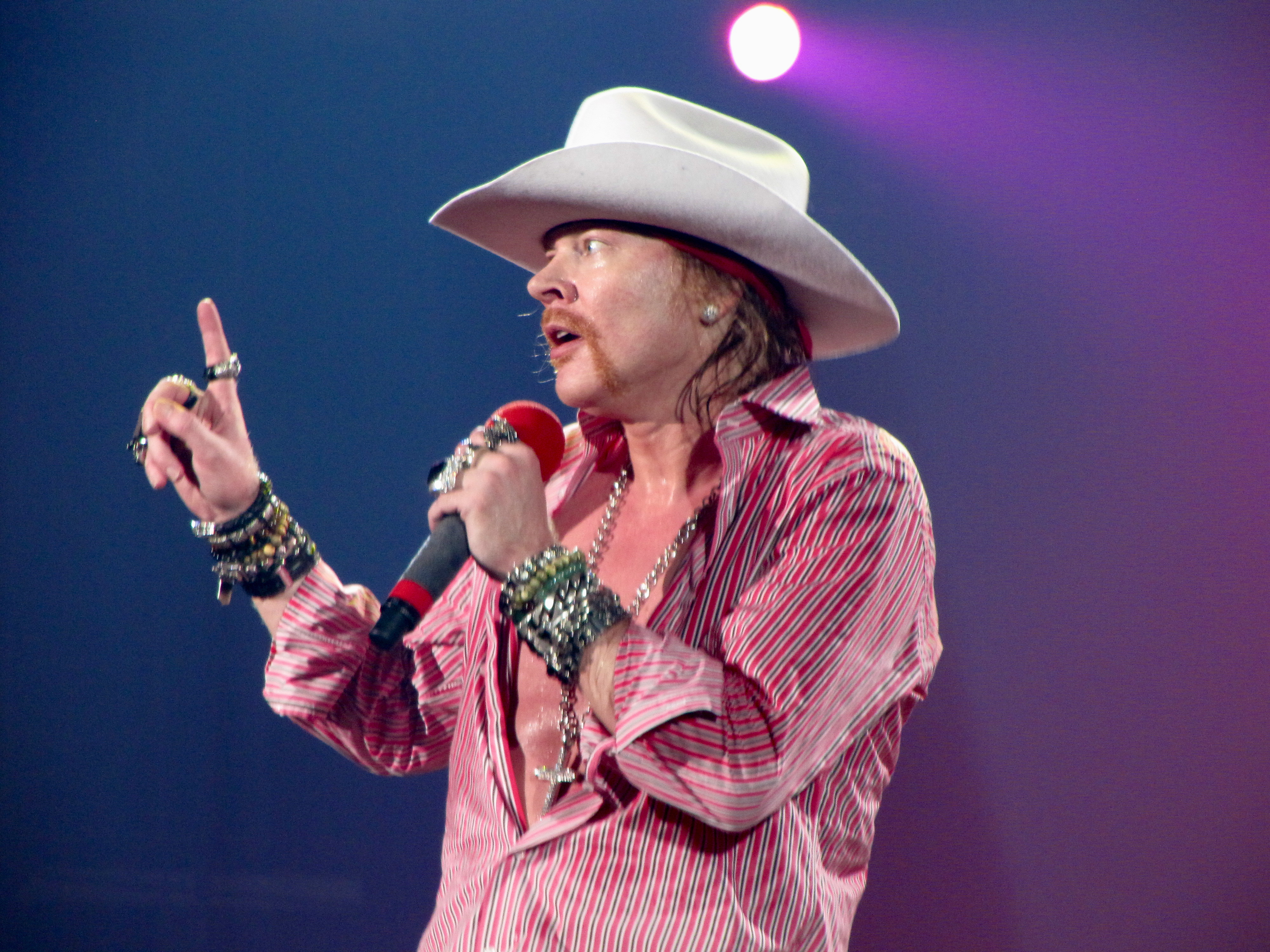
Axl Rose, "a man you'd want in your corner"

On the track "Axl Rose", Argos has said that "I think GnR are a great band. I think if you got into an argument with someone, you'd want Axl in your corner. He's a good guy to have on your side. You know, you don't want Rivers Cuomo defending you. Axl Rose is the guy who will stand up for you. It's funny, I was recording the song with Frank Black, and he's going, "you know, if there's one thing you can say about Axl, it's that he tells people to fuck off!" It was pretty amazing having a conversation with Black Francis about Axl Rose"

The album track "Axl Rose" marks the second time that Argos has written about the volatile Guns N' Roses frontman. The first was his 'Open Letter To Axl Rose', first published in Artrocker magazine, in which he says that, while he is a fan of Rose's work and that Guns N' Roses "have some of the world's greatest songs in their arsenal", he feels that Axl "needs to address his punctuality and perhaps trim down the band's current lineup". It was written in response to the Axl's controversial Reading Festival performance the previous year.

In their review of the album, Consequence of Sound noted that Axl Rose "is a fitting tribute to the Guns N' Roses vocalist; mindless lyrics about checking out his middle finger and beating the world to the punch. It's a little silly, a little dumb, and heavy on the riffage… which is to say, it's a lot like Axl Rose".

== Brilliant! Tragic! comic ==
To accompany the album, Art Brut compiled a comic book version of Brilliant! Tragic! to be released simultaneously. The Brilliant! Tragic! comic book features artwork by a range of artists, including Akira The Don, Bryan Lee O'Malley, Hope Larson, Jamie McKelvie, Jeffrey Brown, Jeffrey Lewis, Let's Be Friends Again, Marc Ellerby, Mr Solo, Sian Superman and Patrick McQuade. Argos was "over the moon and incredibly flattered that these artists took time out to work" on the comic.

Argos says, "When we first had the idea of creating an Art Brut comic I compiled a list of all my favourite artists and then handed the list to our manager (as I am far too shy to approach those people). I thought only one or two would say yes. I was completely blown away when they all did and then flattered they would take the time to create something for us. As I had chosen all my favourite artists and writers for the project I was expecting to be blown away by every new submission, it went beyond even that though. I love what has been created and I recommend that you go out and collect everything by everyone who has contributed to this comic".

A lifelong comic book enthusiast, Argos' passion for comic books has already crossed over into Art Brut's music and art work, with Art Brut vs Satan's DC Comics & Chocolate Milkshake referencing the legendary publishers of Batman, Superman, Wonder Woman, Justice League and Green Lantern. The same album also had artwork designed by acclaimed graphic novelist Jeff Lemire. In 2010, Argos unveiled his comic book themed side project named "Spoiler Alert", whose three track EP featured songs inspired by DC Comics characters Batman, Booster Gold and Blue Beetle. He also writes an online comic book review for Playback called "Pow to the People".

"I can remember the first comic I ever read" Argos said, "it was the Beano, the day I had my tonsils out. I was given it as a treat as I couldn't eat anything. It might have been the only time I've turned down Ice Cream, it blew my tiny 6-year-old mind. I loved comic books growing up but always had a fear they might be something I would have to give up as an adult. Then one day somebody, I still don't know who, put some Batman comics through our letter box. These blew my tiny 11-year-old mind. They were pretty full on, nothing at all like the Adam West goofing around show I had seen Saturday morning television. In these stories people were being murdered, they were political, and morally ambiguous. If my mum had known how different they were from the Saturday morning kids show she would have taken them off of me. I loved them though and realised then that they were something that would stay with me into adult life and have spent all my money on comics ever since".

=== Bad Comedian ===
Jeffrey Lewis's Bad Comedian strip focused on the Joker acting out the lyrics to the song, with his drunken resentment aimed at Watchmen character The Comedian. The strip ends with the Joker hurling his nemesis through a window, parodying the opening of Watchmen.

Artist Patrick McQuade, who worked on the comic book, described the experience as "very cool" and said, "I had total creative freedom to do whatever I wanted. I chose the album's final song "Sealand". It was a blast to do!"

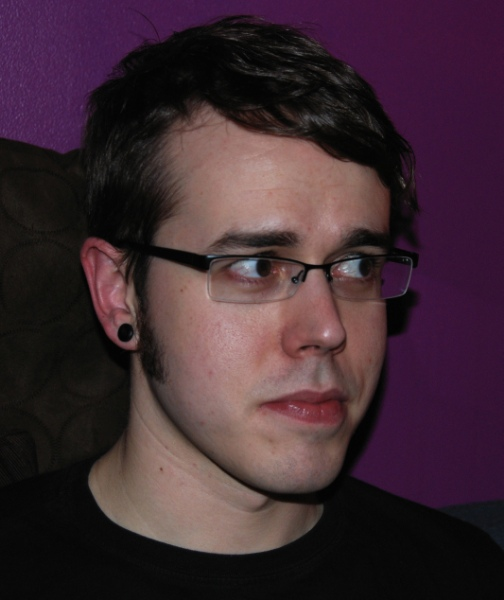
The album cover was designed by cartoonist and illustrator Jamie McKelvie

== Track listing ==
No.	Title	Length
1.	"Clever Clever Jazz"	3:44
2.	"Lost Weekend"	4:22
3.	"Bad Comedian"	4:14
4.	"Sexy Sometimes"	3:32
5.	"Is Dog Eared"	6:16
6.	"Martin Kemp Welch Five-A-Side Football Rules!"	2:14
7.	"Axl Rose"	3:28
8.	"I Am The Psychic"	2:43
9.	"Ice Hockey"	5:31
10.	"Sealand"	3:58
Total length:		39:55

An additional track, "Unprofessional Wrestling" was recorded in the same sessions, and not included on the album, but leaked to the internet in advance of the album's release.

== Credits ==
- Eddie Argos - vocals
- Ian Catskilkin - Guitar
- Jasper Future - Guitar
- Freddy Feedback - Bass guitar
- Mike Breyer - drums
