= The Buffalo Bar =

Music and arts venue in Islington, London, England

Coordinates: 51.546074°N 0.103393°W

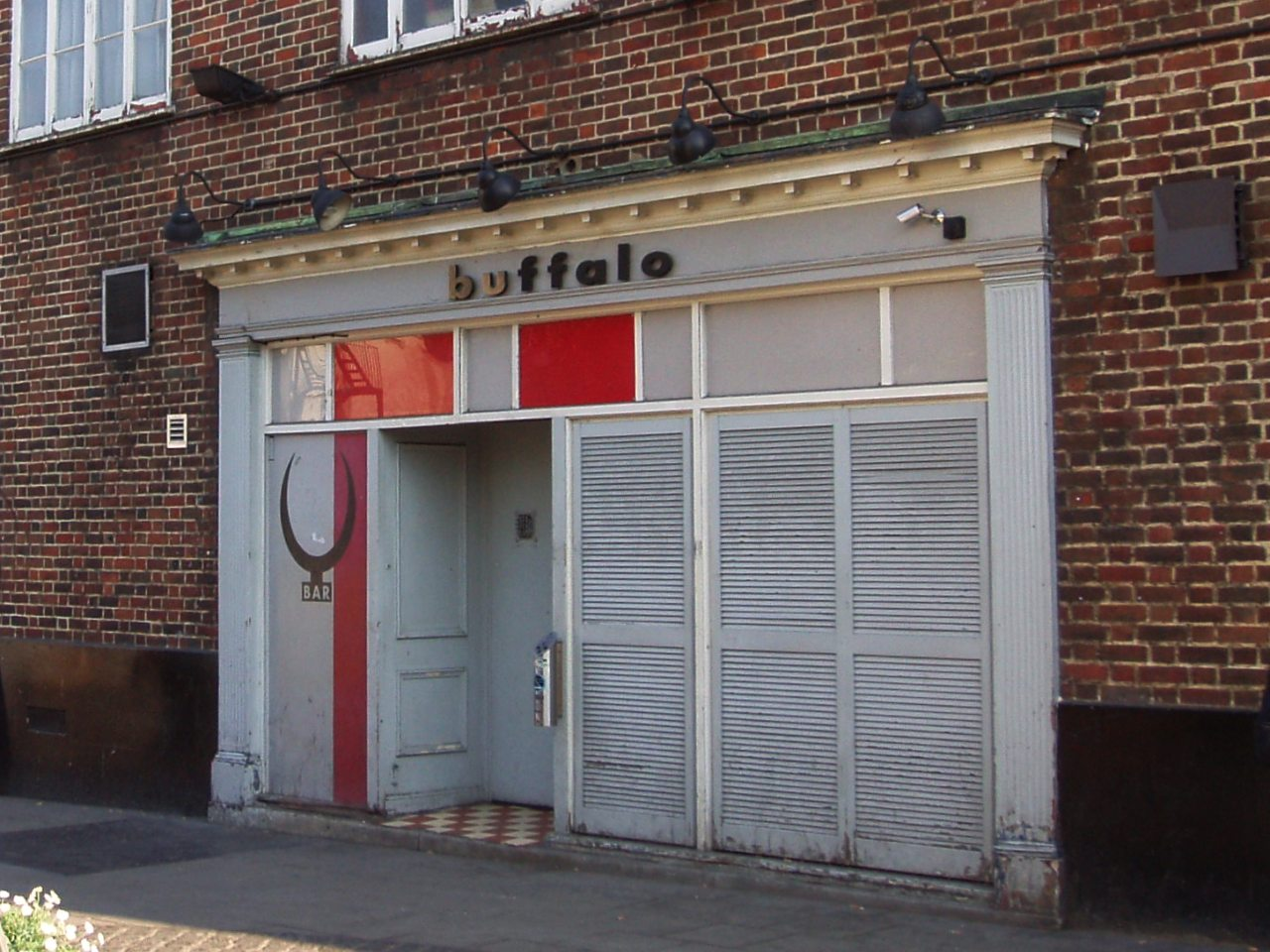
- Interactive map of The Buffalo Bar
- Location: 259 Upper Street, Islington; London, N1; United Kingdom
- Capacity: 300

Construction
- Opened: April 2000
- Closed: December 2014

The Buffalo Bar was a music and arts venue located at 259 Upper Street, Highbury Corner, Islington, from 2000 until 2014.

== History ==
The venue was situated beneath The Famous Cock Tavern, adjacent to Highbury & Islington station. The basement at 259 Upper Street had previously been a branch of Po Na Na nightclub, and before that, Club Down Under. The Buffalo Bar opened in 2000 and hosted performances by a large number of notable alternative and indie rock artists.

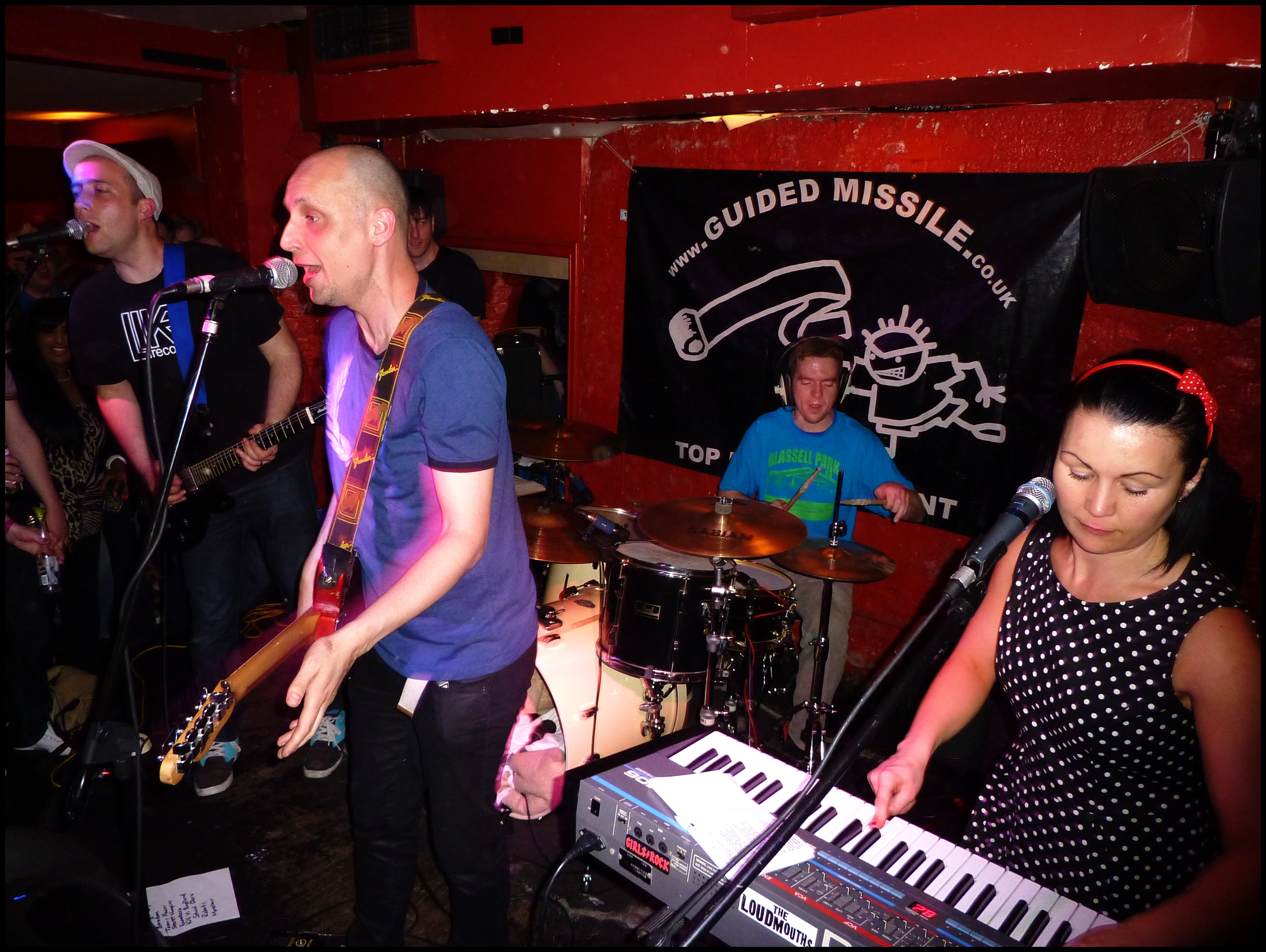
Bis performing at the Buffalo Bar in 2012.

As well as live concerts the venue hosted a number of club nights, including The Cave Club, Great Big Kiss, Afro Cuban Lounge, How Does It Feel to Be Loved?, Twee As Fuck, Artrocker, Guided Missile and Indieoke.

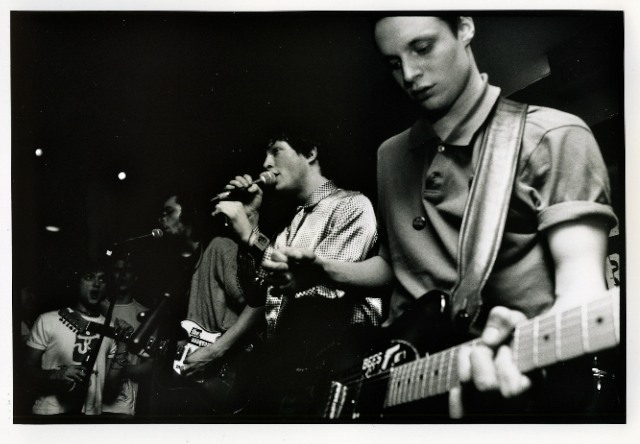
The Maccabees at Artrocker Festival, Buffalo Bar, 2006

Promotional videos were also filmed at the venue including for Electric Eel Shock, Comet Gain and the Ethical Debating Society.

== Notable artists to perform at The Buffalo Bar ==
- Animal Collective
- Art Brut
- the Art Goblins
- Bis
- Bloc Party
- Blood Arm
- Blood Red Shoes
- Bombay Bicycle Club
- the Brian Jonestown Massacre
- Chris T-T
- Colour Me Wednesday
- Country Teasers
- the Cravats
- Desperate Journalist
- the Duke Spirit
- Electrelane
- Emmy the Great
- Thee Faction
- Factory Floor
- Fat White Family
- the Featherz
- Fiery Furnaces
- Foals
- Friendly Fires
- Futureheads
- Future of the Left
- Ed Harcourt
- High Llamas
- the Homosexuals
- Hope of the States
- the Horrors
- Hot Chip
- Joanne Joanne
- the Joy Formidable,
- KaitO
- Keane
- Keith Top of the Pops & His Minor UK Indie Celebrity All-Star Backing Band.
- The Kooks
- Jon Langford
- Larrikin Love
- The Libertines
- the Long Blondes
- the Lovely Eggs
- the Maccabees
- the Magic Numbers
- Male Bonding
- Martha Wainwright
- Maxïmo Park
- Scout Niblett
- the Nightingales
- Oneida
- the Organ
- the Pains of Being Pure at Heart
- Part Chimp
- Pink Grease
- the Popguns
- Poppy and the Jezebels
- Josh T. Pearson
- Jack Rose
- Savages
- Shrag
- Sleaford Mods
- Spearmint
- Stereolab
- These New Puritans
- Tiny Masters of Today
- Frank Turner
- the Tuts
- T.V. Smith
- Two Door Cinema Club
- We Are The Physics
- the Wolfhounds
- Victorian English Gentlemens Club
- Yummy Fur
- Zombina and the Skeletones
- the Zutons

== Closure ==
In November 2014, the Buffalo Bar announced that its lease had been terminated and the club would therefore be forced to close at New Year. A petition to save the venue garnered over 5500 signatures, the support of bands such as The National, The Subways and Mclusky (who performed a fundraising gig for staff), and the intervention of local politicians including local councillor Olly Parker and local M.P. Emily Thornberry. Parker said in a speech that the Buffalo Bar had "probably done more for cultural life in Islington than anyone" and Thornberry stated that the bar "makes a very important contribution to youth culture and.. the cultural significance of this part of London."

The Buffalo Bar was one of a number of grassroots London music venues subject to closure during the same period, including Madame Jojo's, 12 Bar Club, Power Lunches, The Grosvenor, Passing Clouds and The Silver Bullet – prompting questions over the future of venues faced with the threat of "soaring rents..noise pollution orders, and developers". The Mayoral Music Venues Taskforce reported in 2015 that 35% of small venues had closed since 2007. In 2016 incoming Mayor of London Sadiq Khan appointed a "Night Czar", Amy Lamé, with a remit of looking at this issue.
