= The Art Goblins =

English alternative rock band

- Origin: Bournemouth, England
- Genre: Alternative rock
- Years active: c 1996 – present
- Label: Independent
- Members: Eddie Argos; Mutt Ruffalo; Jasper "Jeff" Future; Nicky Biscuit; Pab Gigolovski; Bolt Jenkins; Keith Totp
- Website: myspace.com/theartgoblins

The Art Goblins are an English alternative rock band featuring Art Brut members Eddie Argos and Jasper "Jeff" Future.

== History ==
The band was originally formed in Bournemouth in the 1990s by Argos when at sixth form college; after the initial members apart from Argos (vocals, vacuum cleaner) and Future (rhythm guitar) left to go to university they were replaced by Matt Ruffalo on guitar, Nicky Biscuit on keyboard, and Pab Gigolovski on bass guitar.

The band became moribund when this second wave of members also left for university; Argos later formed Art Brut with Chris Chinchilla and Ian Catskilkin (another member of the Bournemouth music scene); when Chinchilla left he would be replaced with Future. The Art Goblins have subsequently performed a number of reunion shows. A 2005 gig at the Buffalo Bar was described as an "exhilarating performance" by Artrocker.

== Members ==
The Art Goblins are:

- Eddie Argos (lead vocals)
- Mutt Ruffalo (lead guitar)
- Jasper "Jeff" Future (guitar, backing vocals)
- Nicky Biscuit (keyboard)
- Pab Gigolovski (bass guitar)
- Bolt Jenkins (drums)
- Keith Totp (Vibe, violins, other)

== Discography ==
=== Albums ===
"Fuck Rock, Let's Chart"

=== Singles ===
Fuck The M.S.P. / My Conscience Died With Those Prostitutes! (split 7-inch with Billy Ruffian) Filthy Little Angels Singles Club, (May 2007)

=== Compilations ===
Audio Antihero Presents: "Some.Alternate.Universe" for FSID – contributes "Disco"
