= GURR =

German garage rock band

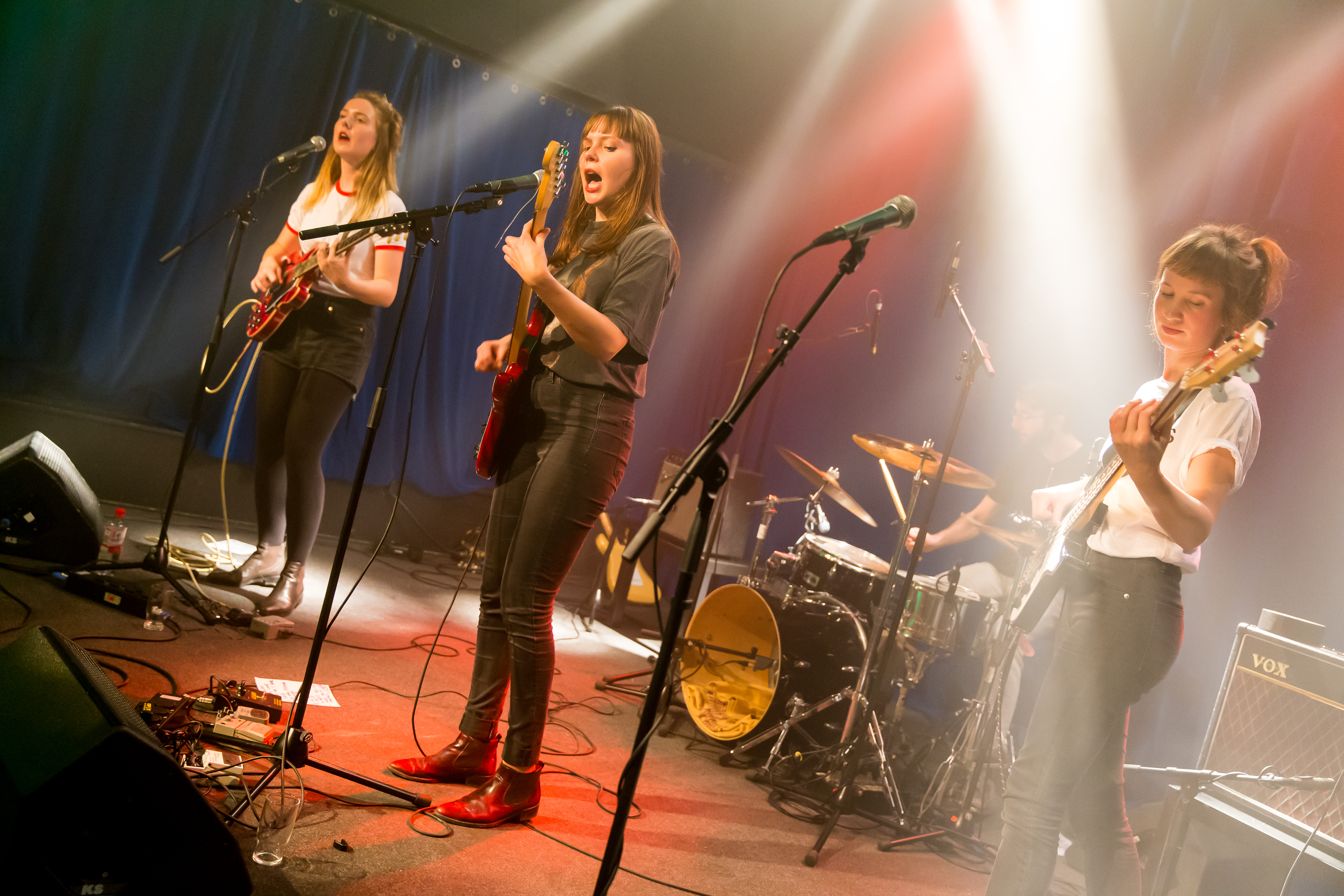
- GURR at live in 2016.

Background information
- Origin: Berlin, Germany
- Genres: Garage rock, hard rock, indie rock, post-punk revival
- Years active: 2012–present
- Label: Duchess Box
- Members: Andreya Casablanca; Laura Lee
- Website: www.gurrband.com

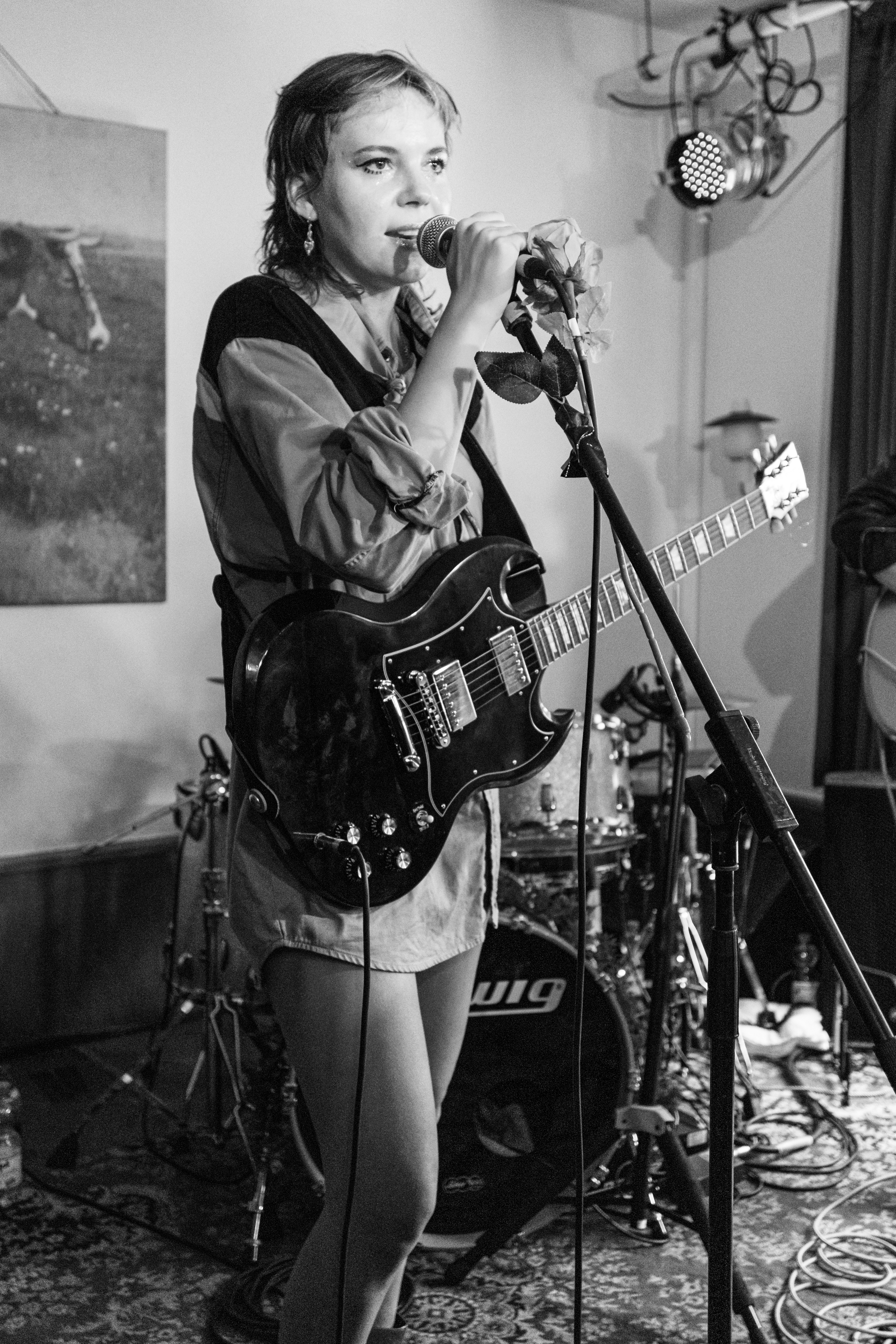
Andreya Casablanca at the Haldern Pop Festival 2019.

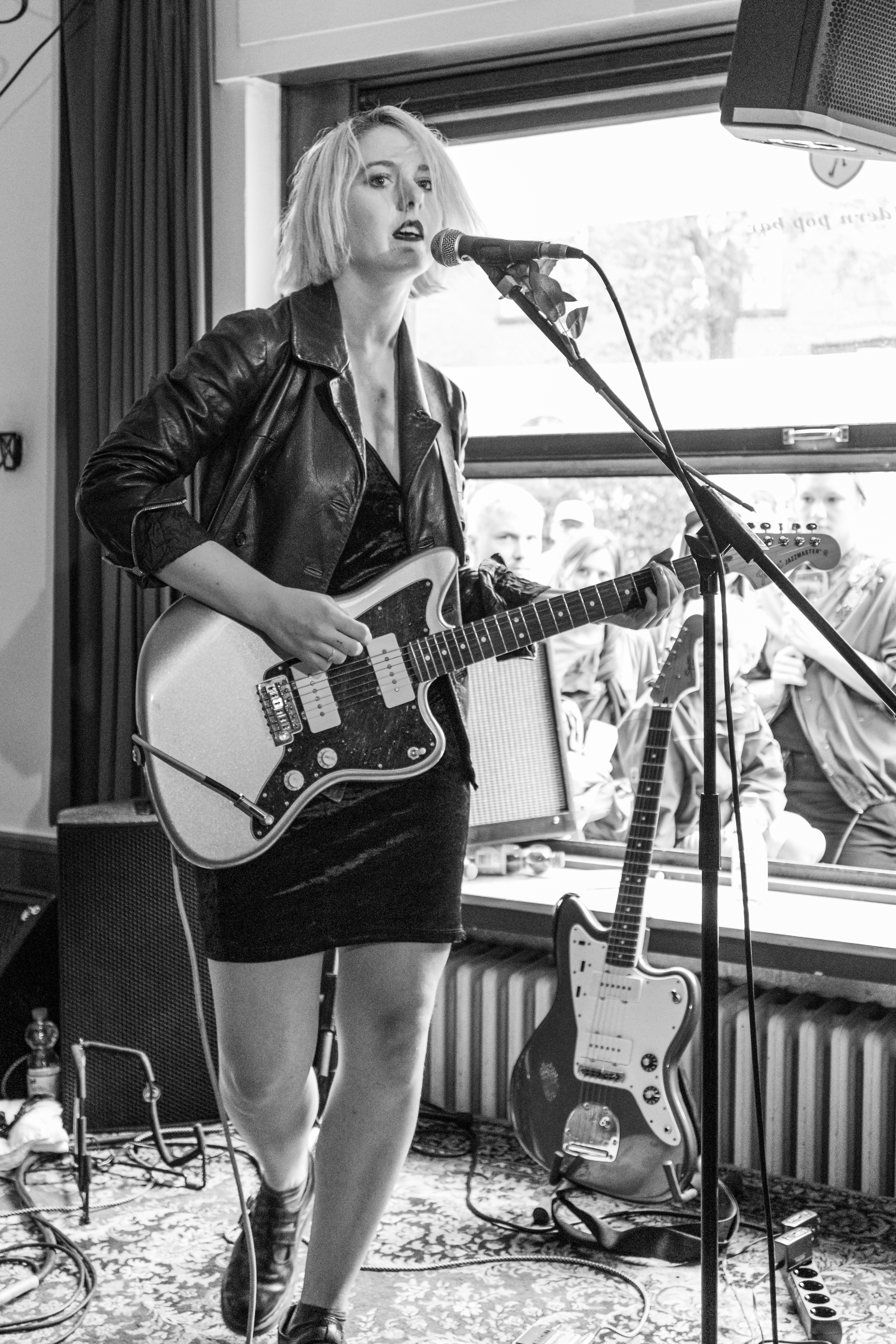
Laura Lee at the Haldern Pop Festival 2019.

Gurr are a German garage rock duo, consisting of Andreya Casablanca and Laura Lee (both on vocals and guitar). Their debut album, In My Head, was released in 2016, and was the Independent Music Companies Association album of the year.

== Biography ==
Casablanca, who is from Nuremberg, and Lee, from Oldenburg, met in Berlin while doing North American studies, and formed a band together soon after. They self-released the Furry Dream EP in April 2015.

They recorded their debut album, In My Head in a studio at Funkhaus Berlin. Its release was preceded by the singles Moby Dick and Walnuts (present on the album in a German language version, "Walnuss" - their only German language song). The album was released in October 2016, to positive reviews.

In 2017 the band toured Europe extensively and also played SXSW in Austin, Texas, and did a session at Maida Vale Studios for Huw Stephens on BBC Radio 1 in the United Kingdom. They supported The Go! Team and Shame on UK tours in the spring of 2018. In May 2018 the band released a new single, "Hot Summer", which was followed by various festival dates including Immergut, and the Rock am Ring and Rock im Park festivals. The band ended 2018 by collaborating with Eddie Argos of Art Brut on Christmas songs for a new "Christmas Business" EP.

In 2021, Casablanca collaborated with British band Public Service Broadcasting on the track "Blue Heaven" from their third album, Bright Magic. Casablanca again collaborated with the band on their next album, The Last Flight, featuring on the song "The Fun Of It".

== Discography ==
Albums

- In My Head (October 2016)

EPs

- Furry Dream (April 2015)
- Christmas Business (December 2018)
- She Says (April 2019)

Singles

- "Moby Dick" (July 2016)
- "Walnuts" (September 2016)
- "#1985" (February 2017)
- "Hot Summer" (May 2018)
- "She Says" (February 2019)
- "Zu Spät" (March 2019)
- "Fake News" (March 2019)

Compilations and Misc.

- Gurr (October 2014)
- Gurr / Burnt Palms Split (February 2014)
