= Jim Moray =

English folk musician (born 1981)

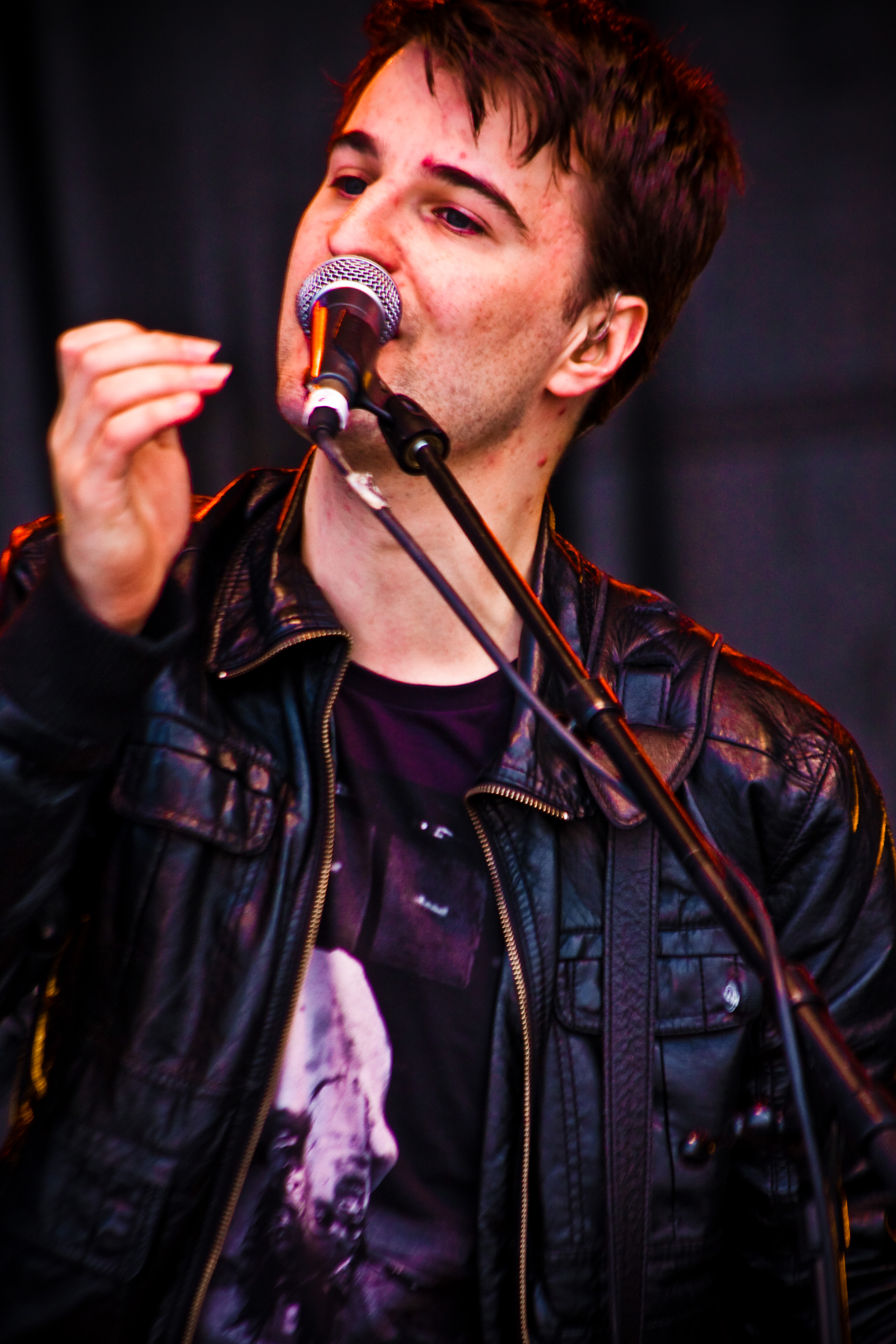
- Moray at a St George's Day celebration at Trafalgar Square in April 2009

Background information
- Born: Douglas Oates; 20 August 1981 (age 45); Macclesfield, Cheshire, England
- Genres: Folk; Folk rock Experimental; English folk music
- Instruments: Voice, piano, guitars, drums, bass, melodeon and Programming

Jim Moray (born Douglas Oates; 20 August 1981) is an English folk singer, multi-instrumentalist and record producer.

== Recording artist ==
While studying classical composition at the Birmingham Conservatoire, Moray released the home-recorded I Am Jim Moray EP. During 2002 he appeared at the Glastonbury Festival and the Cambridge Folk Festival gaining notice in the music press. A nomination for the "Horizon Award" at the BBC Radio 2 Folk Awards 2003 followed before he began work on his first full-length album, Sweet England. The album was recorded in his bedroom while completing his final year of study. Sweet England was released in June 2003 on his own Niblick Is A Giraffe record label.

At the BBC Radio 2 Folk Awards in 2004, he was presented with the Album of the Year Award for Sweet England and the Horizon Award for best newcomer. He was also nominated twice in the Best Traditional Song category for Early One Morning and Lord Bateman.

Moray recorded and released the single Sprig of Thyme in May 2004, and in the autumn appeared on the Oysterband's Big Session Volume 1 album. This gained yet more Folk Award nominations in 2005, including one for Cuckoo's Nest, which was sung, produced, and mixed by Moray.

After a long gestation period, Moray's eponymous second album was released on 1 May 2006. Moving away from the electronic sound of Sweet England, it features a more orchestral sound and denser song structures.

On 6 July 2007, The Independent featured Sweet England in its "Cult Classic" series, affirming its impact and influence on the modern folk scene.

Jim Moray's third album, Low Culture, was released on 14 July 2008. On this album, Moray makes use of African kora, the melodeon, mandolin, and mbira thumb piano. Low Culture won the fRoots Critics Poll Album of the Year 2008 and was the MOJO Folk Album of the Year 2008. It was also nominated for the Album of the Year Award in the BBC Folk Awards 2009.

On 1 February 2010, Jim Moray's fourth album In Modern History was announced as being given away as a covermount CD with the June edition of Songlines magazine, with a street date of 30 April 2010. The album also would be available in a deluxe box set and standard editions on 7 June 2010.

Moray's fifth studio album, Skulk, was released on Bandcamp with no build-up or warning in January 2012, going straight to number one on the Bandcamp chart. It received a full release on 9 April 2012. Moray received three nominations in the BBC Radio 2 Folk Awards for Best Album, Folk Singer of the Year, and Best Traditional Track (for Lord Douglas), winning the last category.

Along with singer and guitarist Sam Carter in 2014, Moray launched a new band named False Lights to play traditional music with electric instruments. Their album Salvor, produced by Moray, was released in February 2015 and they announced headline shows at Folk East, Trowbridge Village Pump, and Homegrown festivals.

Moray's sixth album, Upcetera, was released on September the 30th 2016, featuring orchestral arrangements blended with electric rhythm section, electronic soundscapes and, on several tracks, viol played by Damon Albarn and Nico Muhly collaborator Liam Byrne. It was nominated for Best Album and Best Original Track for Sounds of Earth at the 2017 BBC Radio 2 Folk Awards, at which he also performed the opening track Fair Margaret and Sweet William.

On Moray's seventh album, The Outlander, he explored a more stripped-down style of playing and arranging influenced by the British folk revival of the 1960s and '70s and featuring Bellowhead fiddle player Sam Sweeney on six tracks. It was released on 11 October 2019 and was Moray's first album to be released on vinyl as well as CD and download.

In February 2023, Moray entered Abbey Road Studios to re-record songs from across his career to celebrate 21 years of recording and performing. These recordings were released as Beflean in November 2023, and named as Tradfolk.co's album of the year.

Moray's ninth album Gallants was released on May 1st 2026, and made a return to the full band sound of Low Culture or Skulk. It reached number 6 in the Official Folk Albums Chart and gained airplay on BBC 6Music, Radio 2 and Radio 4.

In July 2026 Moray was appointed Professor of folk composition and performance at Leeds Conservatoire

Moray has spoken of receiving abuse online for his hopes of making traditional music relevant to mainstream audiences.

== Producer ==
Aside from all of his own albums, Moray has produced other artists, initially from his own studio in Bristol profiled in a Sound on Sound feature in 2006.

Moray produced and mixed the track "The Cuckoo's Nest" for the Oysterband Big Session in 2004. This was a live album, recorded over two nights, featuring a similar line-up to the tour in which he took part in 2003. The track was nominated in the BBC Folk Awards that year.

During 2005, Moray produced and performed on James Raynard's debut album Strange Histories, released in September 2005 on One Little Indian records.

In 2008, he wrote and produced the song "The Wishfulness Waltz" for his sister Jackie Oates' second album The Violet Hour and played all the instruments on the track. He subsequently produced and mixed her third album, Hyperboreans, which was released in September 2009 and nominated for three BBC Radio 2 Folk Awards (including best album), and MOJO magazine's top folk albums of 2009. In 2015, he produced and mixed her sixth album, The Spyglass and the Herringbone and co-wrote the majority of the tracks.

Moray produced and mixed the debut album Roodumdah by Kent-based folk-rock band Wheeler Street in autumn 2008. In 2010 he produced and mixed Find The Lady by Belshazzar's Feast.

In 2014, he produced and mixed the second album by singer and songwriter Maz O'Connor, This Willowed Light. They worked together again on her third album, The Longing Kind. In the same period, he also produced the debut album by London folk band Tir Eolas, Stories Sung, Truths Told.

Moray produced Salvor, the debut album by False Lights – his collaboration with Sam Carter, in 2015. The band released Harmonograph, a second album also produced by Moray in 2018.

Moray produced Art Brut's fifth album, Wham! Bang! Pow! Let's Rock Out!, after previously collaborating with lead singer Eddie Argos on the lo-fi musical The Islanders at the Edinburgh Fringe in 2013. The album was released by Alcopop! Records in 2018.

In 2023, he began working with electro-folk singer and musician Frankie Archer, who had previously cited his work as an influence. He co-produced (with Archer) and mixed her EP Never So Red in late 2023 and Pressure and Persuasion in 2024, and contributed additional production and programming to her full length debut The Dance Of Death in 2026.

Moray produced, mixed, and performed on Blair Dunlop's fifth studio album, Out of the Rain in 2024.

== Live performer ==
Moray's early live shows frequently featured video projections and lighting effects, which were relatively uncommon in British folk music.

During 2001–2003, Moray played as a solo performer, becoming well known for using a laptop and loop pedals live. After the release of Sweet England in 2003, he began playing with a variety of accompanying musicians, notably drummer Laurence Hunt. This flexible line-up toured extensively as an electric band, with Moray playing electric guitar and supplemented by samples and sequences from laptops onstage.

Following the Jim Moray album, during 2007–2008 Moray's line-up solidified around a core of melodeon player Nick Cooke and violinist James Delarre, frequently performing as an acoustic trio before eventually adding drummer William Bowerman in 2008. Bowerman left the band in the summer of 2009 to join electro-pop act La Roux and was replaced by Dave Burbidge. After puncturing both lungs, Cooke was replaced by Saul Rose for some festival appearances in summer 2009. In 2012, Moray toured with an expanded "Skulk Ensemble" to play the Skulk album live, with added brass, bass, and his sister Jackie Oates on backing vocals. In November 2013, Moray staged a 10th-anniversary performance of his first album Sweet England at the Union Chapel in Islington, London, featuring a string section and special guests including Bella Hardy, Jackie Oates, Keston Cobblers Club, and Maz O'Connor.

In 2017, Moray assembled a 10-piece band featuring strings, woodwinds, and an electric rhythm section to play the music from his Upcetera album on tour. This line-up was invited to close the show at the 2017 BBC Radio 2 Folk Awards held at the Royal Albert Hall.

As an opening act or collaborator, Moray has toured with Oysterband, Eliza Carthy, Billy Bragg, Richard Thompson, Ani Di Franco, Bellowhead, the Cecil Sharp Project, and John McCusker. He also performed as Orpheus in Anaïs Mitchell's folk opera, Hadestown in January 2011 at the Union Chapel in London.

In 2012, Moray wrote and performed music for the Bristol Old Vic-produced show The Islanders, a collaboration with Art Brut frontman Eddie Argos, and writer and performer Amy Mason.

In May and June 2024, Moray supported Richard Thompson on his band tour promoting the release of the album Ship to Shore.

== Discography ==
=== Performer ===
- I Am Jim Moray (EP) (2001)
- Sweet England (2003)
- Sprig of Thyme (single) (2004)
- Jim Moray (2006)
- Barbara Allen (vinyl single) (2006)
- Low Culture (2008)
- Lucy Wan (single) (2009)
- In Modern History (2010)
- A Beginners Guide (compilation) (2010)
- Big Love (single) (2011)
- Skulk (2012)
- Upcetera (2016)
- The Outlander (2019)
- Beflean (2023)
- Gallants (2026)

=== Producer or guest musician ===
- Glance – Rose Kemp (piano and programming) (2003); Rose Kemp later provided additional vocals for the album Jim Moray
- Big Session Vol. 1 – Oysterband (vocal/guitar/piano and production/mixing) (2004)
- Strange Histories – James Raynard (production/mixing and vocal/bouzouki/concertina/piano) (2005)
- The Violet Hour – Jackie Oates (production/song-writing and guitar/tenor guitar/double bass/drums/piano on the track "The Wishfulness Waltz") (2008)
- Roodumdah – Wheeler Street (production/melodeon/keyboards) (2009)
- Hyperboreans – Jackie Oates (production/bass/guitars/keyboards) (2009)
- The Mother of All Morris – Ashley Hutchings (vocal/guitar on track "Black Joke") (2009)
- Find The Lady – Belshazzars Feast (production/mixing) (2010)
- Cecil Sharp Project – contributed tracks "Dear Kimber" and "Earl Brand" (2011)
- Revenge of the Folksingers – (Concerto Caledonia) (vocal on tracks "My Lord of Marche Pavem", "The Foggy Dew", "Delighted/The Lincolnshire Poacher") (2011)
- This Willowed Light – Maz O'Connor (production/mixing) (2014)
- The Longing Kind -- Maz O'Connor (production/mixing) (2016)
- The Spyglass And The Herringbone – Jackie Oates (production/mixing/arrangements) (2015)
- Stories Sung, Truths Told – Tir Eolas (production/mixing) (2015)
- Salvor – False Lights (production/mixing/writing/performance) (2015)
- Hadelin – Chris Foster (production/mixing/performance) (2016)
- Harmonograph – False Lights (production/mixing/writing/performance) (2018)
- Wham! Bang! Pow! Let's Rock Out! - Art Brut (production/mixing) (2019)
- Vivaldi Sleep – Orchestra Of The Swan (vocals, arranging) (2021)
- Labyrinths – Orchestra Of The Swan (vocals, arranging) (2021)
- Never So Red – Frankie Archer (co-production/mixing) (2023)
- Pressure And Persuasion - Frankie Archer (co-production/mixing) (2024)
- Out Of The Rain – Blair Dunlop (production/mixing/performance) (2024)
- The Dance Of Death - Frankie Archer (additional production and programming) (2026)
