= Wham! Bang! Pow! Let's Rock Out! =

Studio album by Art Brut
- Released: 23 November 2018
- Genres: Indie rock, art punk, garage punk, garage rock
- Label: Alcopop! Records
- Producer: Jim Moray

Art Brut chronology
| Brilliant! Tragic! (2011) | Wham! Bang! Pow! Let's Rock Out! (2018) |

Singles from Wham! Bang! Pow! Let's Rock Out!
- 1. "Wham! Bang! Pow! Let's Rock Out!" Released: 15 August 2018; 2. "Hospital" Released: 2 October 2018

Wham! Bang! Pow! Let's Rock Out! is the fifth album by Art Brut released on 23 November 2018. The album is the band's first album in seven years after the 2011 release Brilliant! Tragic!. The lead-off single from the album was the eponymously titled "Wham! Bang! Pow! Let's Rock Out!", the first new Art Brut material to be released since 2011. A second single, with video, "Hospital!" was released on 2 October 2018, along with full details of the album.

== Cover ==
The album cover is by pop artist Jim Avignon, and its design references the cover to Days of Future Passed by the Moody Blues.

== Reception ==
Professional ratings
Review scores
| Source | Rating |
|---|---|
| Drowned in Sound | link |
| The Guardian | link |
| MusicOMH | link |
| Irish Times | link |
| Pitchfork | link |

== Track listing ==
| No. | Title | Length |
|---|---|---|
| 1. | "Hooray!" | 2:14 |
| 2. | "Hope You're Very Happy Together" | 3:12 |
| 3. | "Good Morning Berlin" | 3:23 |
| 4. | "She Kissed Me (And It Felt Like a Hit)" | 3:48 |
| 5. | "Schwarzfahrer" | 2:36 |
| 6. | "Hospital!" | 3:21 |
| 7. | "Too Clever" | 2:44 |
| 8. | "Kultfigur" | 2:30 |
| 9. | "Veronica Falls" | 2:30 |
| 10. | "Wham! Bang! Pow! Let's Rock Out!" | 2:48 |
| 11. | "Awkward Breakfast" | 3:10 |
| 12. | "Your Enemies Are My Enemies Too" | 2:58 |

== Personnel ==
- Eddie Argos – vocals
- Ian Catskilkin – guitar
- Toby MacFarlaine – guitar
- Freddy Feedback – bass guitar
- Charlie Layton – drums
