= Formed a Band =

Single by Art Brut

from the album Bang Bang Rock & Roll
- Released: 29 March 2004
- Genre: Post-punk revival
- Length: 2:58
- Label: Rough Trade Records
- Producer: Keith Top of the Pops

Art Brut singles chronology
"Formed a Band" (2004)	"Modern Art/My Little Brother" (2004)

"Formed a Band" is song by English-based indie rock band Art Brut. It was released as a single on 29 March 2004 by Rough Trade Records and reached number 52 in the UK Singles Chart. A later recording, produced by John Fortis, is present on their 2005 album Bang Bang Rock & Roll.

The earlier version of the song was released on the Angular Records sampler in November 2003 and is featured on the compilation Art Brut Top of the Pops as "Formed a Band (Early Keith Top of the Pops Version).

== Track listing ==
No.	Title	Length
1.	"Formed a Band"	2:53
2.	"Bad Weekend"	2:43

== Reception and legacy ==
The song is featured on the 2006 EA Sports Video game, FIFA Street 2 as well as an episode of ITV's Lewis, the popular Inspector Morse spin off. It was also included on the Pitchfork 500. In December 2009, NME listed "Formed a Band" as the 32nd best single of the decade. In October 2011, NME placed it at number 102 on its list "150 Best Tracks of the Past 15 Years".

In 2012, They Might Be Giants frontman John Flansburgh listed the song as one of his top 10 tracks – praising the "countless fanciful lyrical turns".
