= Art Brut =

The term Art Brut (French for raw or rough art) may refer to

- visual art created outside of the boundaries of official culture, known in English as Outsider Art;
- the English rock band Art Brut
