= Rebekah Delgado =

British singer-songwriter

- Genres: pop rock
- Instruments: vocals, guitar
- Years active: c. 2001–present
- Label: Four in the Morning Records
- Website: www.facebook.com/therebekahdelgadopage

Rebekah Delgado is a British singer-songwriter based in Andalucía, Spain. Delgado co-fronted London indie rock group Ciccone in the 2000s, before starting a solo career. Her first solo album Don't Sleep was Album in the Month in ArtRocker magazine in October 2012, being described as a "stunning debut" that "successfully blends cabaret, Nick Cave, flamenco, and Scott Walker with Delgado's breathless and occasionally seductive vocals". IndieLondon wrote that it was "diverse collection of songs that underlines Delgado as a distinct and playful artist who defies easy categorisation or comparison." Tracks from the album saw national radio play on BBC Radio 2 and BBC 6 Music.

== Discography ==
- "Sing You Through the Storm" EP (May 2012)
- "Menage a Moi" EP (October 2012)
- Don't Sleep album (October 2012)
