= Everybody Was in the French Resistance...Now! =

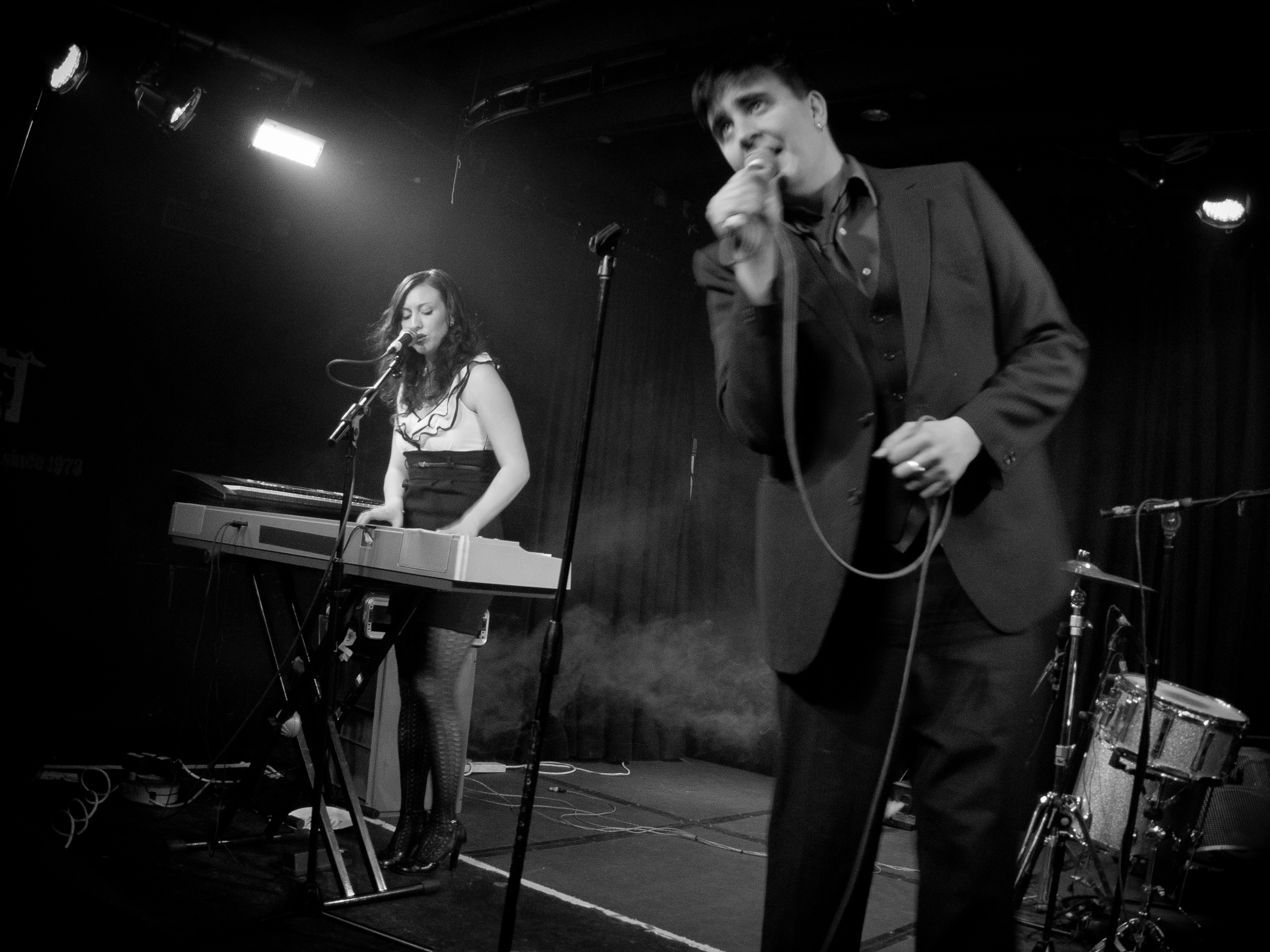
- Everybody Was in the French Resistance...Now! in 2010

Background information
- Origin: Deptford/Bournemouth, England & Los Angeles, California
- Genre: Indie rock
- Years active: 2010–present
- Label: Cooking Vinyl
- Members: Eddie Argos; Dyan Valdés

Everybody Was in the French Resistance...Now! are a band dedicated to writing responses to popular songs, featuring Eddie Argos of Art Brut and Dyan Valdés of The Blood Arm. They have released one album, Fixin' the Charts, Vol. 1 in 2010.

== History ==
Eddie Argos announced the band on his blog in 2008, stating that this was a response to Avril Lavigne attempting to "steal men from happy and loving relationships," a sardonic reference to her song "Girlfriend". Eddie Argos is a renowned 'music geek', and took the opportunity to reply to several songs on this project, from 60's soul numbers on "Hey, It's Jimmy Mack", to Kanye West on "Coal Digger".

It is currently not clear if the band was a one off side project, or if there are plans for a second album, although it has been mentioned in passing on Eddie Argos' blog.

== Fixin' the Charts, Vol. 1 ==
Fixin the Charts, Vol. 1

Studio album by Everybody Was in the French Resistance...Now!
- Released: 25 January 2010
- Recorded: Joshua Tree
- Genres: Indie rock, garage punk, garage rock
- Length: 35:26
- Label: Cooking Vinyl
- Producer: Dave Newton

Everybody Was in the French Resistance...Now!'s album was recorded in Joshua Tree, California, and was produced by David Newton (guitarist) of The Mighty Lemon Drops. The 12 tracks reply to a wide variety of songs, and often take a completely different tack to the original, for example, where Creeque Alley by The Mamas and the Papas sang about the history of the band and the California music scene of the time, Creque Allies is a potted history of the French Resistance in World War II.

=== Critical reception ===
Professional ratings
Aggregate scores
Source	Rating
Metacritic	60/100
Review scores
Source	Rating
Allmusic	2.5/5 stars
Pitchfork Media	3.5/10 stars
Spin	7/10 stars
Robert Christgau	(A−)
The A.V. Club	(B)

The album received mixed reviews in the media. Pitchfork, who are normally favourable to Argos' main band Art Brut stated that it was "for obsessives only", and of the concept that, "a mildly amusing Myspace click can lead to a painfully obnoxious album." It was also variously described as "half finished", and "disposable" However, Spin magazine gave the album 7/10, referring to Eddie as "one of his generation's great poets of the mundane".

However, some songs on the album were praised individually in the same reviews, for example He's a Rebel was regarded as "Funny and witty", and Stereogum referred to Argos as "Indie rock's thick-browed sardonic clown prince.". Contact Music's largely negative review did concede that, "There are moments of pitch perfect piano pop".

=== Track listing ===
#	Title	Time	Answer song to
1	"Creque Allies"	3:08	The Mamas & the Papas – "Creeque Alley"
2	"G.I.R.L.F.R.E.N (You Know I've Got A)"	3:21	Avril Lavigne – "Girlfriend"
3	"(I'm So) Waldo P. Emerson Jones"	2:52	The Archies- "Waldo P. Emerson Jones"
4	"The Scarborough Affaire"	2:29	"Scarborough Fair" (trad. arr.)
5	"Billy's Genes"	3:27	Michael Jackson – "Billie Jean"
6	"Think Twice (It's Not Alright)"	3:31	Bob Dylan – "Don't Think Twice, It's All Right"
7	"Hey! It's Jimmy Mack"	3:01	Martha & The Vandellas- "Jimmy Mack"
8	"He's A "Rebel" "	2:42	The Crystals – "He's A Rebel"
9	"Coal Digger"	2:40	Kanye West- Gold Digger
10	"My Way (Is Not Always the Best Way)"	3:19	Frank Sinatra – "My Way"
11	"Superglue"	1:37	Elastica – "Vaseline"
12	"Walk Alone"	3:19	Gerry & The Pacemakers – "You'll Never Walk Alone"

=== Personnel ===
- Eddie Argos – Vocals
- Dyan Valdés – Vocals, piano, composer
- David Newton – Producer, guitar, bass
- Louis Castle – Trumpet
- Nick Armoroso – Drums
- Bekki Newton – Vocals
- Dave Schultz – Mastering
