= The Rocks (band) =

English indie rock band

The Rocks were an English punk and indie rock band from London, England. Their last lineup comprised James Taylor (vocals), Mauro Venegas (lead guitar), Sarah Bacon (rhythm guitar and keyboards), Chris Mann (bass) and Nick Bukowski (drums).

== Career ==
=== 2001-2003 ===
The Rocks were formed in 2001 by James Taylor and Sarah Bacon, inspired by seeing live performances by At The Drive-In. Taylor began writing the early Rocks material, recruiting lead guitarist and co-songwriter Mauro Venegas and bassist Chris Mann, mainly through a series of chance encounters. The original Rocks line-up was completed by Aidan Clooke, a bandmate of Taylor's from his previous outfit Ojo, on drums.

Early self-financed recordings made up the band's debut, independent AA-sided single, "Everybody in the Place" / "I Won't Need You When You're Dead", which garnered a favourable press response upon its release in March 2003. The follow-up release that summer, again an AA-side, paired the disco-era Rolling Stones tribute "We Got It" with the traditional set closer "The Bomb". The band kept a heavy gigging schedule, sharing bills with the likes of Eighties Matchbox, Futureheads, Art Brut, The Libertines, The Rakes and Razorlight.

Their third single, the Blondie/Elvis Costello-inspired "Celeste" was the most accessible single so far, and moved away from their chaotic garage-punk roots, helping to expand their fan base, although failing to make a breakthrough in terms of radio play. They rounded off the year by beginning work on their debut album with producer Marc Waterman, who had previously worked with Elastica, Ride and ARE Weapons.

=== 2004-2006 ===
The recording of their debut album Asking For Trouble was a difficult period for the band, seeing Clooke leave the band to pursue a career in acting, Taylor and Bacon split up, and financial difficulties which delayed the recording process several times. The band recruited ex-Placebo drummer Robert Schultzberg, who played on some of the album tracks on a session basis, and they completed their first foreign tour, touring the Netherlands and Belgium in June that year. The album was eventually ready for a summer 2004 release, preceded by the single "Can You Hear Me?"

The album received a mixed critical reception, with positive write-ups in The Observer and The Fly balanced by less flattering reviews in The Guardian and the NME. It contained all the singles to date, with a re-recorded "We Got It" being issued as a promo single only (backed with a new recording, "Pluto's Underworld") towards the end of 2004. Internal discord and creative tensions within the band were growing, and after a fractious tour in support of the album (which saw Bacon leave the tour, and the band finish the tour as a four-piece), the band returned to London to try to find a permanent drummer. Jonny Wilson was recruited in early 2005, and played on several new recordings made that year, but was replaced within a year by Nick Bukowski, and the band signed to newly formed independent label Weekender in 2006.

With their line-up settled again, the Rocks found a renewed sense of purpose. The first release on Weekender was the single "Heartbreak City", backed with a version of the Jonathan Richman tune, "I Was Dancing in the Lesbian Bar", that December. They also toured Austria and Germany around this time.

=== 2007 ===
The band spent much of 2007 finishing their long-delayed second album, Letters From The Frontline. It featured songs which had been staples of the live set for a while, veering from '50s style ballads like "Tearjerker" to the raucous "Screamers", which harked back to the earlier material but with more of a '70s glam bent. Further pushing the power-pop angle, "The Game Is Up" was chosen as the next single, as another AA-side (with "Too Much Too Soon"), and was released in October 2007. Despite garnering some positive press (Artrocker magazine described it as having "instant classic written all over it") it again failed to revive the band's profile in the UK.

However, the response to the new material was far more favourable on the Continent. "Letters From The Frontline" was released in Germany, Austria and Switzerland in May 2008, the album having been re-packaged to include the tracks "Heartbreak City" and "Lesbian Bar" - released as the first European single from the album in April. Additional singles ("The Game Is Up" and "On The Roof") were released in Europe, ahead of a tour that September/October.

=== Dissolution ===
Following the tour, the Rocks returned to the UK, whereupon they went their separate ways musically, and busied themselves in different projects. A planned farewell show in London never happened, although "Letters From The Frontline" belatedly received a UK release in May 2009. Guitarist Mauro Venegas joined The Godfathers in 2014.

== Discography ==
=== Singles ===
- "Everybody in the Place" / "I Won't Need You When You're Dead", 2003
- "We Got It" / "The Bomb", 2003
- "Celeste", 2003
- "Can You Hear Me?", 2004
- "Heartbreak City" / "I Was Dancing in the Lesbian Bar", UK 2006, Europe 2008
- "The Game Is Up" / "Too Much Too Soon", UK 2007, Europe 2008
- "On The Roof", Europe 2008

=== Albums ===
- Asking For Trouble.., 2004
- Letters From The Frontline, 2008
