= Ciccone (band) =

British indie rock band

- Origin: London, England
- Genre: indie rock
- Years active: c. 2001 – 2007
- Past members: Rebekah Delgado, Micky Ciccone

Ciccone were a London-based indie rock band active in the 2000s, fronted by Rebekah Delgado and Micky Ciccone, both on vocals and guitar.

They released their first recording in 2001, the "Forget Your False Messiahs" EP; which was made Single of the Week by Steve Lamacq on his Evening Session show on BBC Radio 1.

Their debut album, Eversholt Street, named after the Camden street it was recorded on, was released in 2004, and reviewed widely by the popular music press. Kerrang! rated it 4/5, describing it as a "a cheeky dose of new wave shenanigans". The North West Daily Mail said that their lyrics were "direct, subversive, and funny".

The band broke up after playing a final gig in 2007, supporting Art Brut at the London Astoria. It had been at a Ciccone after-party in 2002 that Eddie Argos would meet Chris Chinchilla, leading to the formation of Art Brut.

Delgado released her first solo album, Don't Sleep, in 2012. Strickson released a solo album, Don't Look Up, There Might Be Blue Skies, in 2017, as Micky C and All the Sad Sad People.

== Discography ==
- "Forget Your False Messiahs" EP, CD single (2001)
- "All Stacked Up", CD single (2002)
- "Look at You Now", CD single (2004)
- Eversholt Street, album (2004)
- "My Summer Never Comes"/"Last Breath", CD single (2005)
