= Keith Top of the Pops & His Minor UK Indie Celebrity All-Star Backing Band =

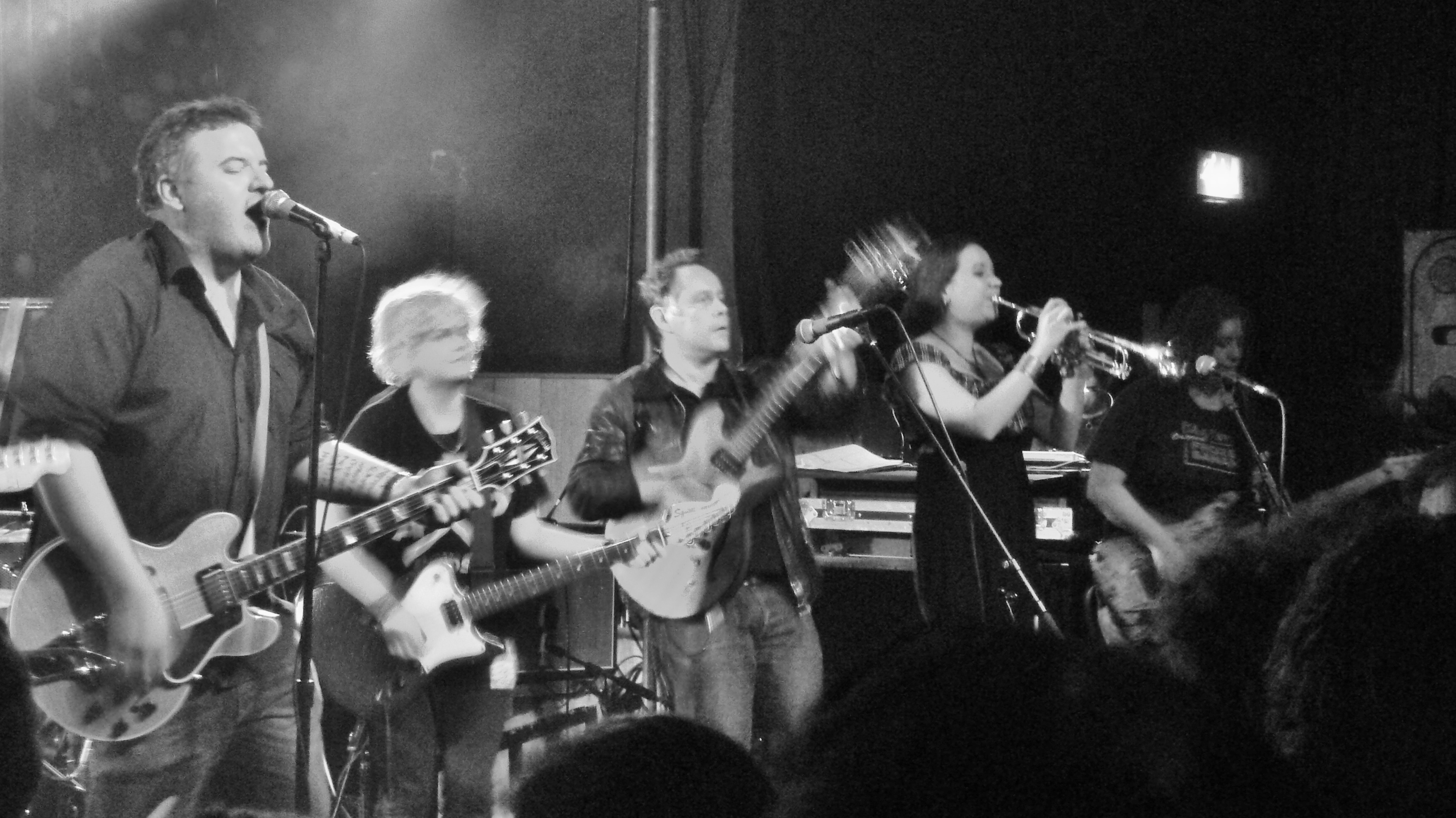
- Some of the band performing at the Scala in 2013. From left to right: Keith TOTP, Charley Stone, Micky Ciccone, Melissa Reardon, Adie Nunn

Background information
- Origin: London, England
- Genre: Indie rock
- Years active: 2006–present
- Label: Corporate Records
- Website: https://soundcloud.com/keith-totp

Keith Top of the Pops & His Minor UK Indie Celebrity All-Star Backing Band is a London-based indie rock band led by singer-songwriter Keith Top of the Pops.

The band was formed at an Art Brut gig in New York City in 2006, after a support band dropped out, and Keith, who had produced Art Brut's first two singles, played some of his songs with members of Art Brut. The band has subsequently featured a rotating line-up of musicians, with two rules, of avoiding soundchecks and never having rehearsals.

The band has released three albums. The first, Fuck You! I'm Keith Top of the Pops (released in 2011), was given 5 stars by and made Album of the Month by Artrocker. The second album TOTP 2 (released in 2013) was reviewed well by PopMatters, which described it as "hard to fault". It was also given 5 stars by Artrocker. A third album, Livin' the Dream, was released in 2018.

== Members ==
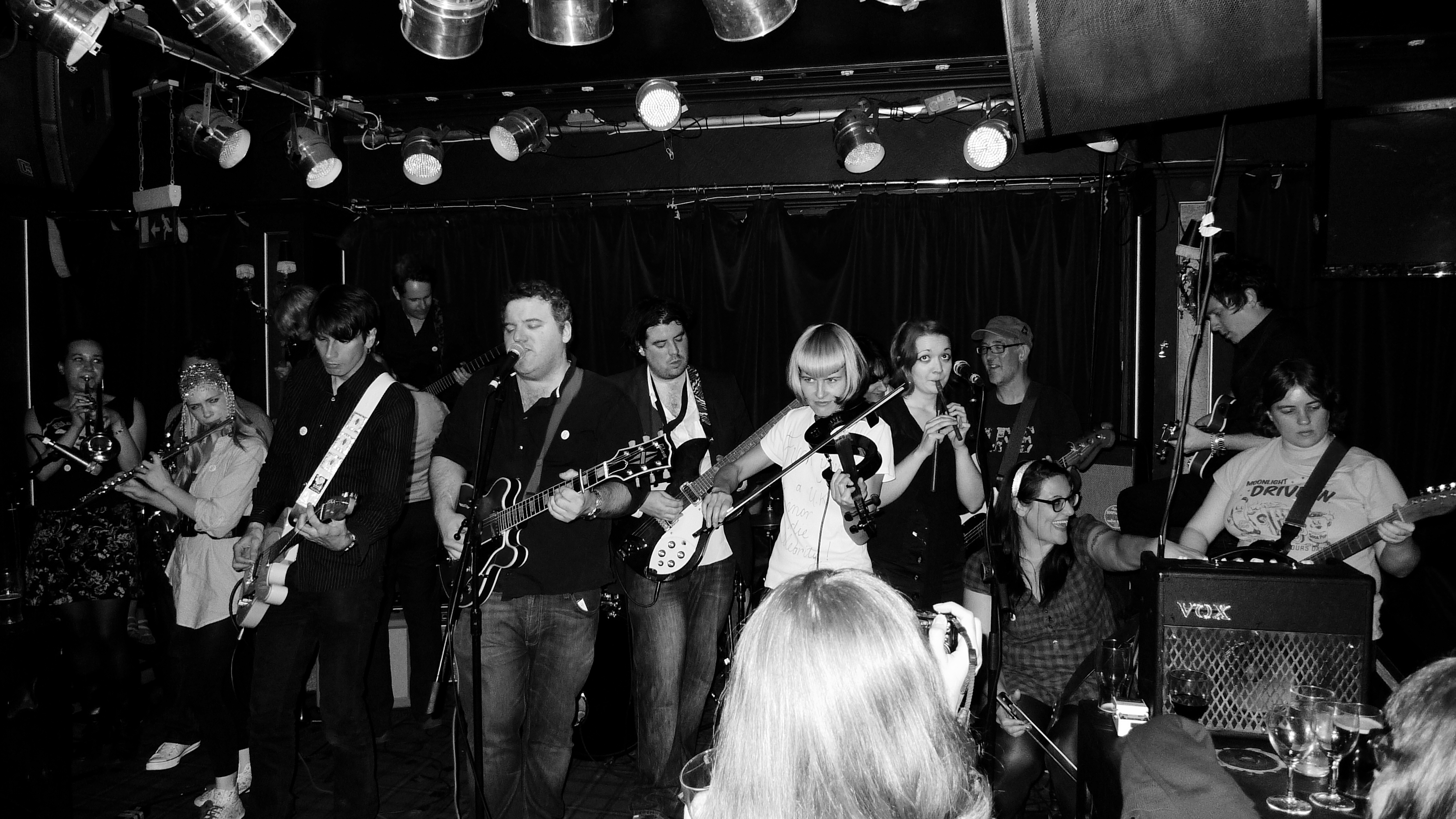
The band performing in 2011. Faces left to right: Melissa Reardon, Emma Cooper, David Barnett, Micky Ciccone, Keith TOTP, Simon Indelicate, Dee Plume, James Rocks, Julia Indelicate, Fruitbat, Sara, Ian Catskilkin, Adie Nunn

On the first two released albums, the credited artists, aside from Keith, are:

- Eddie Argos
- David Barnett
- Jo Bevan
- Rob Britton
- Chris Cain
- Ian Catskilkin
- Micky Ciccone
- Emma Cooper
- Sue Denim
- Mikey Drums
- David Fade
- Johnny Fade
- Jasper Future
- Fruitbat
- Luke Haines
- Charlotte Hatherley
- Julia Indelicate
- Simon Indelicate
- Jimbob
- Arec G Litter
- Jackie McKeown
- John Moore
- Keith Murray
- Sarah Nixey
- Adie Nunn
- Dee Plume
- Melissa Reardon
- James Rocks
- Sara Passmore
- Charley Stone
- Nathan Thomas
- Tim Ten Yen
- Phil Whaite
- Dyan Valdes
- Johnny Yeah

The third album also features Dino Bardot, Joel Black, Steve Brummell, Sean Clothier, Simon Drowner, Mikey Georgeson, Rob Hardy, Ben Lambert, Ally Moss, Aug Stone and Stuffy; with a string section arranged by Martin White consisting of Amy Butterworth, Heather Newton, Jeremy Limb, Ben Handysides, Patrick Ahern and Eric Donohue.

Other musicians to have performed in the band include Zachary Amos and Jennifer Denitto.

== Discography ==
=== Albums ===
- Fuck You! I'm Keith Top of the Pops (Corporate Records, 2011)
- TOTP 2 (Corporate Records, 2013)
- Livin' the Dream (Corporate Records, 2018)

=== Singles ===
- Split ("I Hate Your Band"/"Girl", Filthy Little Angels Singles Club, 2007, with The New Royal Family, as Keith TOTP)
- "#ProperMusic" (2013)
- "You Wish You Were in My Band)" (2013)
- "If You Want Twee (You Got It)" (2018)

=== Compilation appearances ===
- "Two of the Beatles Are Dead", on Two of the Beatles Have Died (Helen Llewelyn Product Nineteen Records, 2009)
