= It's a Bit Complicated =

Studio album by Art Brut
- Released: 18 June 2007
- Genres: Indie rock, garage punk, garage rock
- Length: 33:55
- Label: Mute
- Producer: Dan Swift

Art Brut chronology
| Bang Bang Rock & Roll (2005) | It's a Bit Complicated (2007) | Art Brut vs. Satan (2009) |

Singles from It's a Bit Complicated
- 1. "Nag Nag Nag Nag" Released: 20 November 2006; 2. "Direct Hit" Released: 25 June 2007; 3. "Pump Up the Volume" Released: 11 February 2008

It's a Bit Complicated is the second album by the British band Art Brut. It is the follow-up to their debut album Bang Bang Rock & Roll and was released on 19 June 2007. It debuted on the UK Albums Chart at No. 123.

== Writing and recording ==
It's A Bit Complicated was recorded at London's Terminal Studios and was produced by Dan Swift (whose other work includes Futureheads, Franz Ferdinand and Snow Patrol), "a more like-minded producer" according to Argos. 'With the first album, we were all still at work and stuff, so we couldn't all be in the studio at the time' Argos says. 'We couldn't really gang up on the producer and do what we wanted'. This time round, the band had more input in the production, though. 'We'd all be there at once so we could gang up on him. We'd say "Do it like this!" You're just more comfortable when you're all there. So, that made it better. In fact, Ian [Catskillian] lived at the studio for a bit. We'd come in and find all these new backing vocals and things [that he had done overnight]. When someone is living in the studio, you sort of get into it'.

Explaining the songwriting process, Eddie says; 'I was trying to write the words to the music as they wrote the music, but that was bit stupid and a bit complicated, so I had to go home and write the words at home and I came in and added the words to the music afterwards'.

'We wanted this album to sound sort of bigger and polished' Argos says. 'We're working towards writing very honest pop music. And we mean it. We've been trying to do that. The last two songs I wrote for the first album were "Emily Kane" and "Rusted Guns of Milan." I love them. I like being that person who's so honest. So, this [album] happens to be more like that. And, I'm a bit complicated so, it's a bit complicated'.

Ellaborating on the album's title, Argos said; 'With the first one, Bang Bang Rock & Roll, it was just songs we had been playing live. It was already written when we recorded it. But this time we sort of sat down and tried to write songs… which was a bit complicated. Not too complicated. We got over it. So, the music is more complicated; we've got some trumpets and things like that'. 'That’s what we kept saying all the while we were recording the album;'it’s a bit complicated'. It just made sense that that would be the title.'

== New guitarist ==
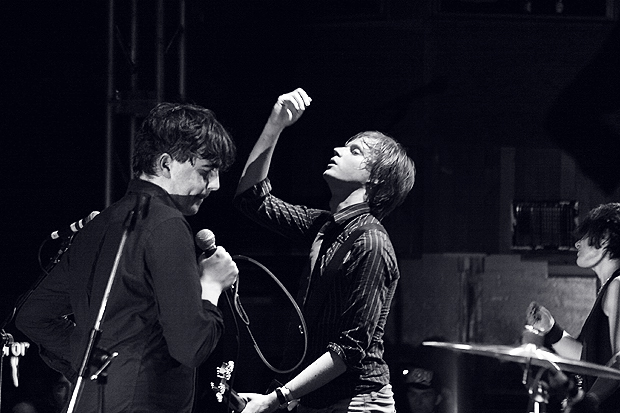
Eddie and new guitarist Jasper 'Jeff' Future

It's A Bit Complicated is the first Art Brut album to feature guitarist Jasper 'Jeff' Future. When Chris Chinchilla left the group in late 2005 (citing financial and personal problems) he was soon replaced by Future, who'd previously played guitar in Eddie Argos' earlier band, The Art Goblins. According to Argos, "Chris didn't want to tour. He gets tired easily. He is busy. He has another band. He is writing a book. He left because of that. He has been replaced by Jasper. I have known Jasper for years. He was in my previous band. I phoned him up: 'Chris has left. Do you want to join?' And he said: 'Sure. When?' I said 'Like Today!' He had to move and leave his house". Reflecting on Chinchilla's departure, Argos has said; 'I’m quite stupid. I thought it was romantic, starving to death in a bedsit somewhere. But Chris likes comfort more than me I think, so he left.'

Talking about Jasper's input in the band, Argos says; 'It's funny, I love the way I see Ian and Jasper [Future, rhythm guitarist] play guitar together. It's like pick-up sticks or legos or something'.

After leaving the group, Chinchilla formed a new band, Macaca Mulata, with former members of London Punk band, Rhesus. The group relocated to Australia and recorded their debut album, AAA, on a budget of $150, in just six hours. The album was released online in April 2008, after the group had disbanded.

== Release and reception ==
Professional ratings
Review scores
| Source | Rating |
|---|---|
| AllMusic | 4/5 stars |
| Artrocker.com | 3/5 stars |
| Blender | 3.5/5 stars |
| NME | (8/10) |
| PopMatters | (7/10) |
| The Guardian | 5/5 stars |
| Pitchfork | (7.4/10) |
| Rolling Stone | 3.5/5 stars |
| Yahoo! Music UK | (5/10) |
| URB | 4/5 stars |

The initial reaction to the album has been generally favorable. The Guardian awarded the album full marks, comparing the group to both The Fall and Half Man Half Biscuit. Their glowing review of the album concluded with the line: "Full of the kind of bathetic genius English pop used to excel in, Art Brut are life-affirming - and are worth 500 of almost every other new guitar band." NME gave the album 8/10, believing that the group seemed "poised on the brink of mainstream acceptance". Pitchfork's review of the album was positive, scoring them 7.4, and noting "Art Brut have succeeded in crafting a satisfying half-mature sequel"

Not all reviews were positive, however; Q's Simon Goddard stated that after their first album Bang Bang Rock & Roll, It's a Bit Complicated sounds "extremely tired," with the "principal culprit" being singer Eddie Argos, who "is torturous after the full 34 [minutes]."

== Departure from EMI ==
In February 2008, EMI released "Pump Up the Volume" the third single from It's a Bit Complicated without informing the band. There was no physical release of the single and only a video was released after the single had been issued. Writing on the Art Brut website, the band stated; "It seems Art Brut have accidentally released a single. Yes, the rumours are true. But how could this happen, you may ask? Why were we not informed? Well, my friends, pick up any thread of incompetence and it will usually lead you to a record company. That's right, it seems EMI have decided to release 'Pump up the Volume' without informing either the band or myself, making any kind of widescale promotion rather difficult." On 1 March 2008, Argos subsequently revealed on his blog that Art Brut and EMI had amicably parted.

== Track listing ==
| No. | Title | Length |
|---|---|---|
| 1. | "Pump Up the Volume" | 2:56 |
| 2. | "Direct Hit" | 3:34 |
| 3. | "St Pauli" | 2:58 |
| 4. | "People in Love" | 3:04 |
| 5. | "Late Sunday Evening" | 3:11 |
| 6. | "I Will Survive" | 3:31 |
| 7. | "Post Soothing Out" | 3:15 |
| 8. | "Blame It on the Trains" | 3:01 |
| 9. | "Sound of Summer" | 2:48 |
| 10. | "Nag Nag Nag Nag" | 3:10 |
| 11. | "Jealous Guy" | 3:18 |
| Total length: | | 33:55 |

- "Direct Hit" was featured in EA Sports' FIFA 08, and also featured Animals That Swim frontman, Hank Starrs, on vocals.

== Personnel ==
- Eddie Argos – vocals
- Ian Catskilkin – Guitar
- Jasper Future – Guitar
- Freddy Feedback – Bass guitar
- Mike Breyer – drums
