= Art Brut vs. Satan =

Studio album by Art Brut
- Released: 20 April 2009
- Genres: Indie rock, art punk, garage punk, garage rock
- Labels: Downtown (US); Cooking Vinyl (Europe)
- Producer: Frank Black

Art Brut chronology
It's a Bit Complicated (2007)	Art Brut vs. Satan (2009)	Brilliant! Tragic! (2011)

Singles from Art Brut vs Satan
- 1. "Alcoholics Unanimous" Released: 6 April 2009; 2. "DC Comics & Chocolate Milkshake" Released: 24 August 2009

Art Brut vs. Satan is the third album by Art Brut, released in Europe on 20 April 2009 and in the US on 21 April. The lead-off single from the album was "Alcoholics Unanimous". The album was produced by Frank Black.

The album cover was designed by Canadian cartoonist Jeff Lemire.

== Writing and recording ==
Explaining the concept behind Art Brut vs Satan, Argos has said; "With the first album, we were at our jobs still, so we were in studio at separate times and didn't see each other the whole time. I thought that was kind of weird. On the It's A Bit Complicated, we tried to make a pop album and were tracking it individually as well, but we realized we're a punk band and wanted to do this album live for the first time and went into a room and bashed it out and pressed record and often went with the first take. Our songs are true stories and I wanted to do them once or twice and record them because you'll lose that sincerity if you do that again and again and again". As such, the decision to work with Frank Black was a simple one. "After we realized we wanted to do that we asked 'who is the expert at doing that?' and came up with Frank Black because that's how he did all of the (Frank Black and the) Catholics' albums. And also, he's cool and we wanted to hang out with him. (laughs) 'What excuse could we use to hire Frank Black?' And then he said that he liked us, so we signed him up".

"It was amazing, I was so glad when he agreed to do it. I thought I would be intimidated, because it's Black Francis you know? But it wasn't, it was amazing. He picked us up at the airport in his car, and he's just such a friendly enthusiastic man. It's hard to be intimidated by him, really, as he's just a good person."

"In the end, he was more like a conductor – we'd rehearse, he'd suggest things and then we'd record it in one take". "He saw the recording process exactly as we saw it", Jasper elaborates. "There was very little overdubbing and guitar trickery. We recorded it all live with Charles concentrating on song arrangement rather than on specific sounds. He let the whole thing run very naturally. As we were playing it all live we got a chance to try and capture some of the energy from the stage show, which for us is very important. I can't imagine recording each part individually now. It seems a little contrived. He was everything we could have expected and more." As a result, the album was completed very quickly. "We recorded the album in a punk-as-fuck two weeks. With Black Francis conducting us, we pressed record, jumped around and played our songs. This is how I always thought albums were made and it's definitely how we're doing it from now on".

== Reception ==
Professional ratings
Review scores
Source	Rating
Allmusic	link
The Fly	3/5 stars
NME	link
Crawdaddy!	favourable link
Pitchfork Media	(7.7/10) link
Planet Sound	link
Robert Christgau	(A−) link
The Skinny	link
This Is Fake DIY	link

Initial critical response to Art Brut vs. Satan was generally positive. At Metacritic, which assigns a normalized rating out of 100 to reviews from mainstream critics, the album has received an average score of 75, based on 24 reviews. Pitchfork awarded the album a positive 7.7, stating in their review that "Frank Black gets the Art Brut spirit down on record better than anyone has before, with the blazing pop-metal vainglory of Weezer, the scruffy cheekiness of early Rough Trade bands, and lots of enthusiastic backing vocals. Fun for them, fun for us". NME's 8/10 review praised Eddie's "Jarvis-like confessional approach", particularly praising 'Am I Normal?', saying "the image of a 14-year-old Argos cowering from the object of his affections behind the magazine racks in WH Smith: truly, this is the indiest notion of all time." Spin gave the album 7/10, and said: "In a world where nothing is a metaphor, singer argos still just digs 'DC Comics and Chocolate Milkshakes,' 'The Replacements,' and records that are 'Slap Dash for No Cash.' And as long as he does, the band behind him will give him three chords and a wink". Crawdaddy! gave the album a glowing review, praising the group's "unbridled enthusiasm for the genre that they love and pay homage to". They also noted that "The Frank Black-helmed production lends Art Brut newfound confidence".

== Track listing ==
No.	Title	Length
1.	"Alcoholics Unanimous"	3:36
2.	"DC Comics and Chocolate Milkshake"	3:28
3.	"The Passenger"	2:59
4.	"Am I Normal?"	2:44
5.	"What a Rush"	3:33
6.	"Demons Out!"	3:41
7.	"Slap Dash for No Cash"	3:13
8.	"The Replacements"	4:10
9.	"Twist and Shout"	3:11
10.	"Summer Job"	2:56
11.	"Mysterious Bruises"	7:24
Total length:		40:50

An additional track, "Just Desserts" was recorded in the same sessions, and not included on the album, but leaked to the internet in advance of the album's release.

Two singles were released from the album. "Alcoholics Unanimous" came out two weeks before the album featuring "Just Desserts" as a B-side. "DC Comics & Chocolate Milkshake" was released as the second single in August as a download only featuring "Weird Science" as a B-side.

== Credits ==
- Eddie Argos – vocals
- Ian Catskilkin – Guitar
- Jasper Future – Guitar
- Freddy Feedback – Bass guitar
- Mike Breyer – drums
