= Artrocker =

British music collective

Artrocker is a UK-based collective involved in music promotion and publishing. It was started by Paul Cox and Tom Fawcett who had been co-promoters of a London night called The Sausage Machine. Having started life with an online newsletter and event promotion in 2001, it has since expanded into various endeavours including a monthly magazine, various websites, a record label, video production, and a weekly radio show.
Artrocker has a reputation for talent-spotting and supporting bands before they become well known. They were the first promoters to bring the Yeah Yeah Yeahs and The Black Keys to the UK and the first to put on concerts in London by The Datsuns, Maxïmo Park, and The Futureheads.

== Magazine ==
Artrocker launched a bi-weekly magazine in October 2004. It has since become a monthly title.

== Websites ==
Artrocker.com is the original Artrocker website and was created as an offshoot of the online newsletter in 2002. It split from the magazine in 2008 and now runs independently of that publication.

Artrocker.tv is the official Artrocker magazine website.

== Events ==
Artrocker hosts regular club nights in London and Brighton. It also participates in various large-scale events, notably the Underage festivals.

== Radio ==
Paul Artrocker presents a weekly show on Resonance.fm which is also syndicated online.

== Record label ==
The Artrocker label is now defunct. It was host to such bands as The Gin Palace, Ten Benson, Mighty Fraff, Electric Shocks, The Hells and The Hotwires.

== 2013 staff ==
- Editor - Tom Fawcett
- Commercial Director - Chris Hornby
- Artrocker Radio - Paul Cox
- Designer - Richard Lucas
- Advertising Manager - Alan Thomas
- Reviews & Online Editor - Luke Lipski
- New Blood Editor - Michael Jamison
- Festivals Editor - Sam Briggs
