= Artrocker (magazine) =

British music and culture magazine

- Issue 47 edition featuring Tiny Masters of Today
- Editor: Marc Sallis
- Categories: Music
- Frequency: Monthly
- Publisher: Volcano Publishing
- First issue: October 2004
- Final issue: 2013
- Country: United Kingdom
- Language: English
- Website: artrockermagazine.com

Artrocker magazine is an independent monthly publication, concentrating on music and modern culture, available across the United Kingdom.

Before switching to a digital format in 2013, it was stocked in larger branches of newsagents, though its main availability was in music stores. The magazine started life as a weekly email newsletter before evolving into a printed magazine. Issue one featured KaitO on the cover and was released on 4 October 2004. The publication appeared on a bi-weekly basis until November 2007 (issue 72), when the magazine began publication on a monthly basis. Launching its first digital edition in 2010, Artrocker slowly phased out the print issue, with the tablet version outselling the magazine by 2012.

Artrocker provides an outlook on modern culture, with information on the UK music scene and the main emphasis firmly being placed on London. There are also sections dedicated to covering art and fashion, and classic bands from the past. Due to the demise of Melody Maker and Sounds, the magazine was considered one of the very few rivals to NME. In 2008, the magazine claimed a circulation figure of 30,369, under current editor-in-chief Tom Fawcett, compared to around 68,000 for NME. Today, the circulation of NME sits at 15,384.

There is a certain rivalry evident between Artrocker and NME, with Artrocker writers and readers apparently referring to NME as "the Comic" and accusing them of jumping on "any old bandwagon".

The online site moved from artrocker.tv to a new website in February 2015.
