= Bang Bang Rock & Roll =

Studio album by Art Brut
- Released: 30 May 2005
- Recorded: The Exchange and Apollo Control
- Genres: Indie rock, art punk, garage punk
- Length: 34:40
- Label: Fierce Panda
- Producers: John Fortis, Howard Gray

Art Brut chronology
Bang Bang Rock & Roll (2005)	Art Brut Live at Schubas 11/15/2005 (2005)

Singles from Bang Bang Rock & Roll
- 1. "Formed a Band" Released: 29 March 2004; 2. "Modern Art/My Little Brother" Released: 6 December 2004; 3. "Emily Kane" Released: 2 May 2005; 4. "Good Weekend" Released: 26 September 2005

Bang Bang Rock & Roll is the debut studio album by British rock band Art Brut. It was re-released in 2006 with bonus CD.

== Reception ==
Professional ratings
Aggregate scores
Source	Rating
Metacritic	83/100
Review scores
Source	Rating
AllMusic	4.5/5 stars
The A.V. Club	A−
Blender	4/5 stars
The Guardian	3/5 stars
Mojo	4/5 stars
NME	7/10
Pitchfork	8.9/10
Spin	B+
Uncut	4/5 stars
The Village Voice	A−

Bang Bang Rock & Roll was released to highly positive reviews from music critics; on the review aggregator site Metacritic, the album holds a score of 83, indicating "universal acclaim". The music review online magazine Pitchfork placed Bang Bang Rock & Roll at number 192 on their list of top 200 albums of the 2000s.

== Track listing ==
- A hidden track; "Subliminal Desire for Adventure", can be found in the pregap of the CD. The first track must be rewound to hear the song.

No.	Title	Length
1.	"Formed a Band"	2:58
2.	"My Little Brother"	2:23
3.	"Emily Kane"	2:41
4.	"Rusted Guns of Milan"	3:45
5.	"Modern Art"	2:23
6.	"Good Weekend"	2:49
7.	"Bang Bang Rock & Roll"	2:14
8.	"Fight!"	2:37
9.	"Moving to L.A."	3:29
10.	"Bad Weekend"	3:03
11.	"Stand Down"	2:51
12.	"18,000 Lira"	1:13

2006 Re-Release Bonus CD
No.	Title	Length
13.	"These Animal Menswe@r"	2:06
14.	"It's About Time"	3:10
15.	"Maternity Ward"	3:16
16.	"Every Other Weekend"	2:02
17.	"Home Altars of Mexico"	2:41
18.	"Really Bad Weekend"	3:47
19.	"Rusted Guns of Milan (Live)"	4:26
20.	"Modern Art (Live)"	3:48
21.	"Moving To LA (Live)"	5:45
22.	"My Little Brother (Live)"	3:39

US Edition Bonus Tracks
No.	Title	Length
13.	"These Animal Menswe@r"	2:06
14.	"Really Bad Weekend"	3:47
15.	"Maternity Ward"	3:16

iTunes Edition Bonus Tracks
No.	Title	Length
13.	"These Animal Menswe@r"	2:06
14.	"Really Bad Weekend"	3:47
15.	"Maternity Ward"	3:16
16.	"Every Other Weekend"	2:08
17.	"Home Altars of Mexico"	2:41
18.	"Rusted Guns of Milan (Live)"	4:26
19.	"Modern Art (Live)"	3:48
20.	"My Little Brother (Live)"	3:39
21.	"Moving To LA (Live)"	5:45

== In other media ==
The first track from the album, "Formed a Band" was featured on the video game FIFA Street 2, as well as an episode of ITV's Lewis, the popular Inspector Morse spin-off. An earlier version of the song had previously been released on "The New Cross: An Angular Sampler", a compilation album released by Angular Records in 2003; and as a single on Rough Trade Records in 2004.

"Moving to L.A." was featured on "Bring Your Own Poison: The Rhythm Factory sessions". The single 'Good Weekend' has been featured on the Channel 4 TV Show Skins as well as the romantic comedy Good Luck Chuck. Although it wasn't released as a single, the album track "Fight!" was used in British teen soap Hollyoaks, while the album's title track, "Bang Bang, Rock & Roll", was featured on the Xbox 360 video game Saints Row as well as the 2012 Chevrolet "Chevy Sonic" Super Bowl Commercial. It was also covered by the American indie rock band We Are Scientists on their 2006 b-sides album Crap Attack.

== Credits ==
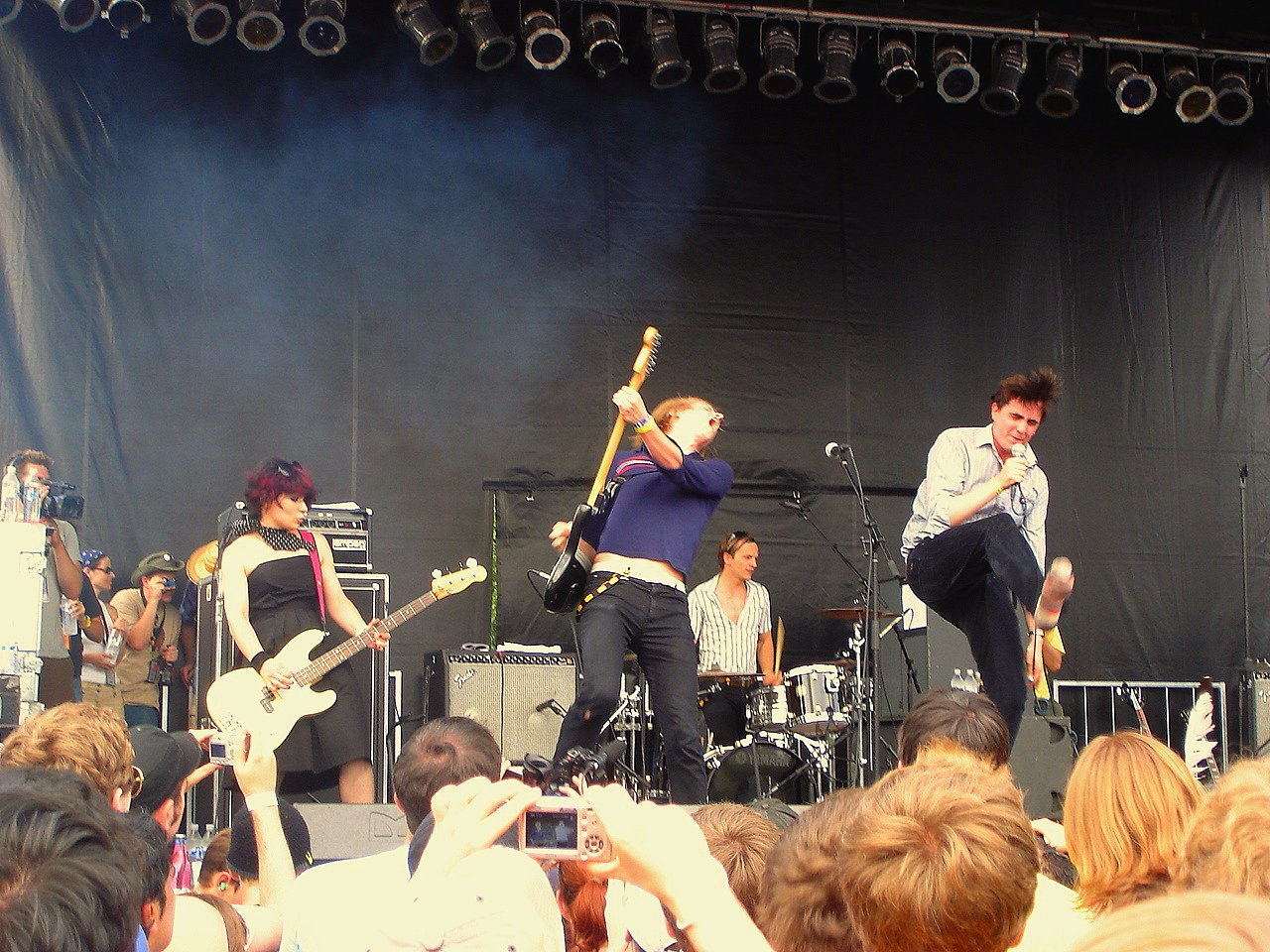
Art Brut - Pitchfork Festival 2006. Left to right: Feedback, Jasper Future, Breyer and Argos.

- Eddie Argos – vocals
- Ian Catskilkin – guitar
- Chris Chinchilla – guitar
- Freddy Feedback – bass guitar
- Mike Breyer – drums
