= Art Brut (band) =

English indie rock band

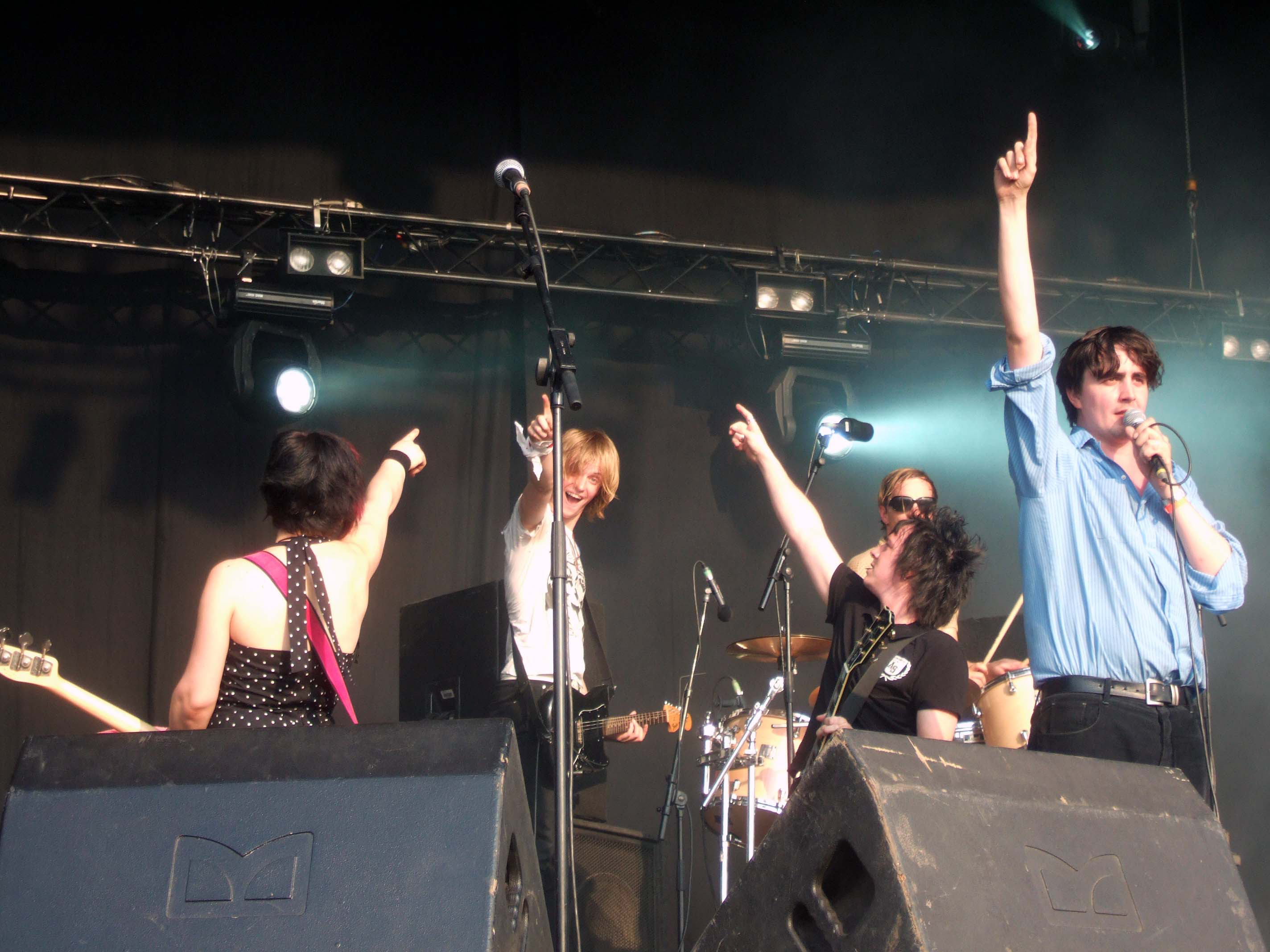
- Art Brut in 2006. From left to right: Feedback, Future, Catskilkin, Breyer (behind), and Argos.

Background information
- Origin: London
- Genres: Indie rock; art punk; garage rock; post punk; garage punk
- Years active: 2003–present
- Labels: Fierce Panda; Mute Records; Downtown Records; Cooking Vinyl; Alcopop! Records
- Spinoff of: The Art Goblins
- Members: Eddie Argos; Ian Catskilkin; Freddy Feedback; Toby MacFarlaine; Charlie Layton
- Past members: Chris Chinchilla; Mikey Breyer; Jasper Future; Stephen Gilchrist

Art Brut is an English indie rock band. Their debut album, Bang Bang Rock & Roll, was released on 30 May 2005, with its follow up, It's a Bit Complicated, released on 25 June 2007. Named after French painter Jean Dubuffet's definition of outsider art – art by prisoners, loners, the mentally ill, and other marginalized people, and made without thought to imitation or presentation – South London's Art Brut were tagged by NME as part of the "Art Wave" scene that also included bands such as The Rakes, Franz Ferdinand and Bloc Party. The band released further albums, Art Brut vs Satan in 2009 and Brilliant! Tragic! in 2011. A fifth album, Wham! Bang! Pow! Let's Rock Out!", was released in 2018.

The band's sound is characterised by their straightforward guitar rock setup, as well as frontman Eddie Argos' enthusiastic sprechgesang-style vocal delivery, and his humorous, often self-reflexive lyrics about music, relationships and other personal interests.

== Biography ==
=== Early years ===
"In the UK at the time, it was very fashionable to be an 'art school band'. I (mistakenly) thought that by naming our band Art Brut, that we would not be lumped in with those other bands, that we would stand apart. Our name meant that we didn't go to art school, that embodied the very definition of outsider art. We were punks.

— Eddie Argos, "I Formed a Band".

Argos had formed The Art Goblins and moved to London in 2001, looking to form a new band. He met guitarist Chris Chinchilla at an afterparty hosted by London indie rock band Ciccone in 2002. Argos also invited Ian Catskilkin, whom he knew from the Bournemouth music scene, to join on guitar. They were joined by Freddy Feedback, Chinchilla's flatmate, on bass guitar and Mikey Breyer on drums; and rehearsed at Scar studios in Camden. The name 'Art Brut' was inspired by Argos's visit to the Musée d'Art Naïf – Max Fourny.

The band played their first gig in May 2003, at the Verge in Kentish Town. After gigging for several months, they recorded demos of "Formed a Band" and "Modern Art" with Keith Top of the Pops at Supernova Studios. The band became associated with the New Cross scene, and this version of a "Formed a Band" was released on new New Cross-based record label Angular's compilation The New Cross: An Angular Sampler, in November 2003.

Rough Trade, a long-running indie music label, offered Art Brut a deal to release "Formed a Band" as a one-off single. It was released in March 2004, backed with "Bad Weekend". It peaked at number 52 on the UK Singles Chart. The band co-headlined a UK tour promoting the single with the Fades.

=== Fierce Panda ===
Rough Trade declined to sign Art Brut up for an album, and the band signed to Fierce Panda, again for a standalone single. This was a double A-side, featuring "Modern Art" and "My Little Brother". For the vinyl release, each individual single cover was unique, being painted by attendees of the launch party. The single was released in December 2004 and charted at number 49, the highest position that a Fierce Panda single had achieved.

After the success of this, Fierce Panda signed Art Brut for their first album, to be called Bang Bang Rock & Roll. It was recorded with producer John Fortis. It features re-recorded versions of "Formed a Band", "Bad Weekend", "Modern Art", My Little Brother", three songs originally written for a concept project about the "Gatti Gang", an off-shoot of the Red Brigades: "18,000 Lira", "Rusted Guns of Milan", "Stand Down".

This album was trailed by the new single "Emily Kane", which made number 41, missing the top 40 only by two sales, later attributed by Argos to a failure to properly register iTunes sales. It remains Fierce Panda's highest-charting single.

The album was released in May 2005. Art Brut played extensively in support of their album in 2005. Chinchilla left due to the pressures of touring in September 2005, and was replaced at short notice by Jasper Future, guitarist from Argos' old Bournemouth band, The Art Goblins, for Bestival. This new line-up toured Europe, including two support slots with Oasis in October 2005 – the band made the cover of the German edition of Rolling Stone magazine in September 2005.

=== Mute ===
Q: "So you went to America and they seemed to just get it?"

Eddie: "Yes, but in England some people were like 'that "Emily Kane" song, that's very funny – is that some sort of emo song or something?' Whereas in America they say; 'That "Emily Kane" – you must have really loved her – they realised I was telling the truth."

— 2006 Interview.

In 2006, Art Brut signed to Mute Records (then owned by EMI) in Europe for the release of another album, with Downtown Records covering the United States. The band toured extensively in the United States in 2006, being the musical guest on Jimmy Kimmel Live! on 4 May 2006, and on a later leg supporting We Are Scientists.

This second album It's a Bit Complicated was produced by Dan Swift (after an attempt by Russell Senior was rejected by the label). The first single from the album, "Nag Nag Nag Nag", was released on 20 November 2006, featuring the b-side "I Found This Song in the Road" and five live tracks from the Eurockéennes de Belfort Festival 2006. The song made Single of the Week in The Guardian's "The Guide" section. In 2007 they played on the American NME Rock and Roll Riot tour with The Hold Steady. The second single, "Direct Hit", was released a week before the album, featuring the B-sides "Don't Blame it on the Trains" and "I Want to be Double A-Sided". Promotion included an appearance on Late Night with Conan O'Brien on 20 June 2007. The album was released in June 2007. In the United States, the album reached No. 14 on the Billboard Heatseekers chart and No. 32 on the Independent Albums chart.

EMI had been under financial problems in 2007 and was acquired by Terra Firma Capital Partners in August 2007. The label released "Pump Up the Volume" as a third single for It's A Bit Complicated in February 2008, as a digital-only release with no video, apparently without telling the band. This led to the termination of the relationship between the band and the label.

=== Cooking Vinyl ===
In late 2008, Art Brut returned to the studio to record their third LP Art Brut vs. Satan which was released on 20 April 2009, on Cooking Vinyl. The album was produced by Frank Black, in his favourite studio in Salem, Oregon. Art Brut vs. Satan was released to mainly good reviews, scoring 75 on Metacritic. There were two singles released from the album "Alcoholics Unanimous" and "DC Comics & Chocolate Milkshake". The band toured throughout the year and played the Glastonbury Festival amongst others, including a five-day residency at the Mercury Lounge in New York City in June.

In late 2010, Art Brut recorded their fourth album, Brilliant! Tragic!, released on 23 May 2011. The first single from the album was "Lost Weekend". The album was again produced in Salem by Frank Black. Promotion included another five-day residency, this time at The Lexington in London.

To celebrate the 10th anniversary of the band's first gig, in 2013, Art Brut released Art Brut Top of the Pops, a two CD best of compilation album, including B-sides and rarities, such as the Brutlegs versions of some early songs. The album title refers to the band's chant during live performances of "Art Brut! Top of the Pops! Art Brut! Top of the Pops!"

On 13 September 2013 it was revealed that Breyer and Future had decided to leave the band, and that their replacements would be Stephen Gilchrist and Toby MacFarlaine respectively.

=== Alcopop! ===
Art Brut's fifth album, Wham! Bang! Pow! Let's Rock Out!, produced by Jim Moray, was released in November 2018, on Alcopop! Records. It was preceded by two singles: the title track "Wham! Bang! Pow! Let's Rock Out!", in August 2018, and "Hospital!" in October 2018. The band now features Charlie Layton from the Wedding Present on drums. After two dates in London in November and January, the band started their first tour since 2013 in February 2019: UK dates in February and March were to be followed by European shows in April. The band then played a number of summer festivals.

Art Brut collaborated with We Are Scientists (see below) for a Record Store Day EP release in 2019. In 2020 they released a German language version of "My Little Brother", "Mein kleiner Bruder". A UK tour with the Subways in spring 2020 was interrupted by the COVID-19 pandemic

For Record Store Day 2020, the band released a re-recorded, 16-minute version of early single "Modern Art", again with record sleeves designed by fans and friends.

=== Relationships with other bands ===
Art Brut invited various bands to provide guest vocals on "Top of the Pops!", their contribution to the second Angular compilation, "Rip Off Your Labels: More Angular Product", including The Boyfriends, The Long Blondes, The Rocks, The Violets, Luxembourg, Ciccone, The Swear and Abdoujaparov. These bands had mostly provided tracks to the Angular compilations themselves. Relations with Bloc Party, also an Angular band, were more strained: a dispute conducted by media between Argos with Bloc Party lead singer Kele culminated in a physical confrontation at a nightclub.

Art Brut had a system of "franchises", whose names range from AB0 (the original Art Brut) to AB3.14/Pi, AB², AB17 or even to AB29600 (from Rennes and Morlaix, France), who perform and cover Art Brut songs.

The band have released a split 7-inch with We Are Scientists in 2006, with Art Brut covering We Are Scientists' "The Great Escape", and We Are Scientists covering "Bang Bang Rock & Roll" (in the style of The Velvet Underground – in reference to the song's lyric of "I can't stand the sound of the Velvet Underground"). We Are Scientists also have an Art Brut franchise number, 47. Art Brut resumed their collaboration with We Are Scientists in 2019, with a split 12-inch for Record Store Day, as "WASABI" (We Are Scientists Art Brut International).

Argos and Black Box Recorder released a single, "Christmas Number One", under the name The Black Arts, in 2007.

In 2010, Argos released an album with the side project Everybody Was in the French Resistance...Now!, featuring Dyan Valdés from The Blood Arm on vocals and keyboards. The album, called Fixin' the Charts was a collection of songs in responses to classic pop songs, including those by Michael Jackson, Martha Reeves & the Vandellas and Kanye West.

The band's early supporter Keith Top of the Pops played his first gig in support of Art Brut in New York in 2006, with members of Art Brut acting as his band. Keith has now released three albums, under the name "Keith Top of the Pops & His Minor UK Indie Celebrity All-Star Backing Band", which variously feature contributions from most of Art Brut, Black Box Recorder, The Blood Arm, We Are Scientists and numerous other musicians, including members of The Boyfriends, Luxembourg, Ciccone and Abdoujaparov.

== Members ==
Current members

- Eddie Argos – lead vocals (2003–present)
- Ian Catskilkin – lead guitar (2003–present)
- Freddy Feedback – bass guitar (2003–present)
- Toby MacFarlaine – guitar (2013–present)
- Charlie Layton – drums (2018–present)

Former members

- Mikey Breyer – drums (2003–2013)
- Chris Chinchilla – guitar (2003–2005)
- Jasper Future – guitar (2005–2013)
- Stephen Gilchrist – drums (2013–2014)

== Discography ==
=== Albums ===
- Bang Bang Rock & Roll (2005) UK No. 116
- It's a Bit Complicated (2007) UK No. 123
- Art Brut vs. Satan (2009) UK No. 138
- Brilliant! Tragic! (2011)
- Wham! Bang! Pow! Let's Rock Out! (2018)

=== Live albums ===
- Art Brut Live at Schubas 15 November 2005 (2005)

=== Compilation albums ===
- Art Brut Top of the Pops (the best of) (2013)
- Sorry, That It Doesn't Sound Like It's Planned! Battling Satan (2025)

=== Singles ===
- "Formed a Band" (March 2004) UK No. 52
- "Modern Art/My Little Brother" (December 2004) UK No. 49
- "Emily Kane" (May 2005) UK No. 41
- "Good Weekend" (September 2005) UK No. 56
- "Nag Nag Nag Nag" (November 2006) (Released as a seven-track CD single featuring five live tracks)
- "Direct Hit" (June 2007) UK No. 194
- "Pump Up the Volume" (February 2008) (Download only single)
- "Alcoholics Unanimous" (6 April 2009)
- "DC Comics & Chocolate Milkshake" (24 August 2009) (Download only single)
- "Lost Weekend" (16 May 2011)
- "Clever, Clever Jazz" (15 August 2011)
- "Wham! Bang! Pow! Let's Rock Out!" (August 2018)
- "Hospital!" (October 2018)

== Music videos ==
- "Modern Art"
- "Emily Kane"
- "Good Weekend"
- "Direct Hit"
- "Pump Up the Volume"
- "Alcoholics Unanimous"
- "Lost Weekend" (directed by Alex de Campi)
- "Wham! Bang! Pow! Let's Rock Out!" (Ben Pollard and Jonny Drewek)
- "Hospital!"
