= Eddie Argos =

British singer (born 1979)

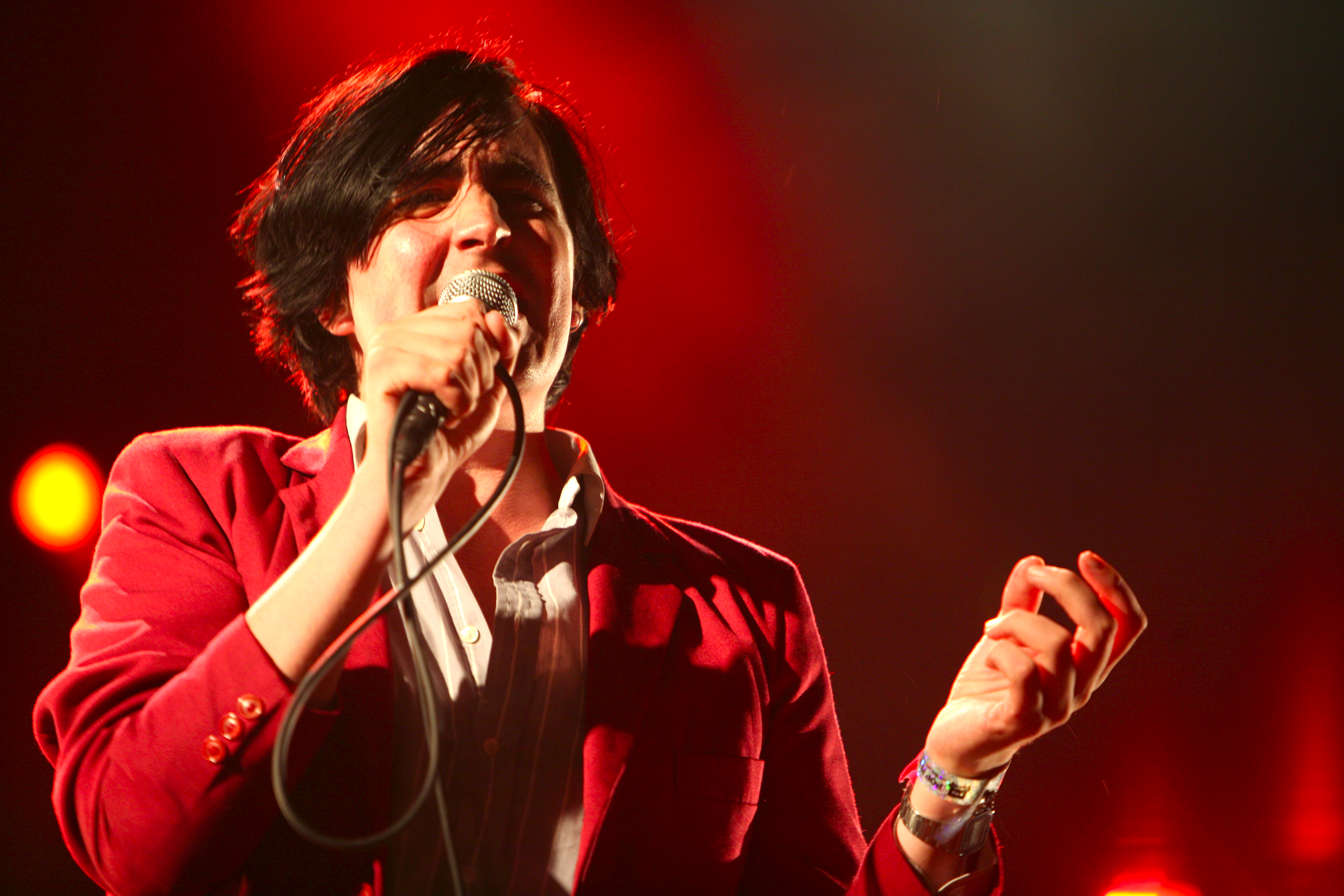
- Argos in 2007

Background information
- Also known as: Eddie Argos
- Born: Kevin Macklin; 25 October 1979 (age 46); Weymouth, Dorset, England
- Genres: Post-punk, alternative rock, spoken word
- Occupations: Singer-songwriter, musician, artist, writer
- Instrument: Vocals
- Years active: 2003–present

Eddie Argos (born Kevin Macklin; 25 October 1979) is the lead singer of English rock band Art Brut, and writer of comics.

== Personal life ==
Born in Weymouth, England, Argos later moved to Poole, Dorset as a young child, and has subsequently written about the Kemp-Welch School there (now St Aldhelm's Academy), in the song "Martin Kemp-Welch Five-A-Side Football Rules!" from the album Brilliant! Tragic!.

== Music ==
Argos is the lead singer of the rock band Art Brut, and sometimes plays the bass guitar in Keith TOTP. Argos is also the lead singer of the project Everybody Was in the French Resistance...Now!, in which he and multi-instrumentalist Dyan Valdes of The Blood Arm write musical responses to pop songs. Their album "Fixin' the Charts, Volume 1" was recorded in Joshua Tree in summer 2008. In June 2011, Eddie appeared as guest vocalist on Akira The Don's "Living in the Future" single. In 2018 Argos collaborated with Berlin-based band Gurr on Christmas songs for a "Christmas Business" EP.

In 2012, Argos wrote an article for DIY magazine as to why he should be the UK's 2013 entry for the Eurovision Song Contest.

In 2021, Argos announced a side project called Haus Band. Their first single, a cover of Bob Dylan's "She Belongs to Me", was released to celebrate Dylan's birthday.

== Paintings ==
As well as his musical output, Argos is also an enthusiastic painter.

Argos explained his love of painting to Skyscraper Magazine: "I really enjoy painting. I love painting great big thick black lines of acrylic paint on canvas. I don't paint very complicated things, just simple images and words really. Nothing ever comes out the way I intend it to, probably because of my Dyspraxia, so I'm always surprised at how they turn out".

== Writing and comics ==
Argos writes an occasional column about comic books for PLAYBACK:stl called "Pow! To The People". He has also contributed a cover quote to the collected edition of Jamie McKelvie's 'Phonogram: The Singles Club' graphic novel.

A lifelong comic book enthusiast, Eddie's passion for comic books has already crossed over into Art Brut's music and art work, with Art Brut vs Satan's "DC Comics & Chocolate Milkshake" referencing the legendary publishers of Batman, Superman, Wonder Woman, Justice League and Green Lantern. The same album also had artwork designed by acclaimed graphic novelist Jeff Lemire. In 2010, Argos unveiled his comic book themed side project named "Spoiler Alert", whose three track EP featured songs inspired by DC Comics characters Batman, Booster Gold and Blue Beetle. Art Brut's 2011 album, Brilliant! Tragic! was created by acclaimed comic book artist Jamie McKelvie.

"I can remember the first comic I ever read" Argos said, "it was the Beano, the day I had my tonsils out. I was given it as a treat as I couldn't eat anything. It might have been the only time I've turned down Ice Cream, it blew my tiny 6-year-old mind. I loved comic books growing up but always had a fear they might be something I would have to give up as an adult. Then one day somebody, I still don't know who, put some Batman comics through our letter box. These blew my tiny 11-year-old mind. They were pretty full on, nothing at all like the Adam West goofing around show I had seen Saturday morning television. In these stories people were being murdered, they were political, and morally ambiguous. If my mum had known how different they were from the Saturday morning kids show she would have taken them off of me. I loved them though and realised then that they were something that would stay with me into adult life and have spent all my money on comics ever since". Argos has also gone on record stating "Batman is the greatest fictional character of all time. No argument".

To accompany the album Brilliant! Tragic!, Art Brut commissioned a comic book to be released simultaneously. The Brilliant! Tragic! comic book features artwork by a range of artists, including Akira The Don, Bryan Lee O'Malley, Hope Larson, Jamie McKelvie, Jeffrey Brown, Jeffrey Lewis, Let's Be Friends Again, Marc Ellerby, Mikey Georgeson, Sian Superman and Patrick McQuade. Eddie Argos was "over the moon and incredibly flattered that these artists took time out to work" on the comic.

Argos released a book of his lyrics for Art Brut in 2013; and in 2014 a book, Formed A Band of memoirs of his time in Art Brut and his earlier bands the Art Goblins.

2015 saw the release of Argos's first full-length comic, Double D, drawn by Steven Horry and published by Image Comics.

== Bands ==
- Art Brut
- The Art Goblins
- The Black Arts
- Deathfox
- The English Travelling Wilburys
- Everybody Was in the French Resistance...Now!
- Art Naif
- Future and the Boy
- Glam Chops (formerly known as Paranoid Dog Bark)
- Spoiler Alert!
- The Donalds (all-male tribute act to the Donnas)

== Discography ==
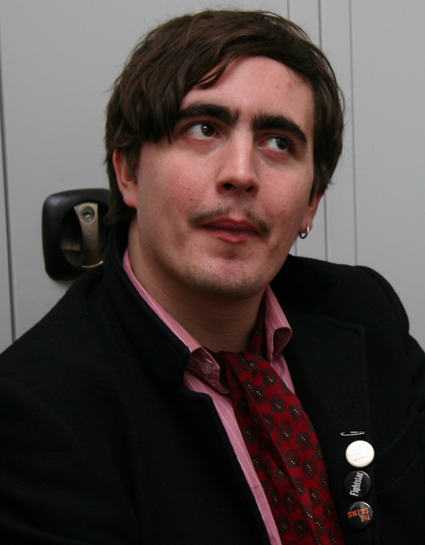
Eddie Argos

=== Art Brut ===
- Bang Bang Rock & Roll (2005)
- It's A Bit Complicated (2007)
- Art Brut vs. Satan (2009)
- Brilliant! Tragic! (2011)
- Art Brut Top of the Pops (2013)
- Wham! Bang! Pow! Let's Rock out! (2018)

=== Everybody Was in the French Resistance...Now! ===
- Fixin' The Charts, Vol. 1 (2010)

=== Spoiler Alert ===
- Spoiler Alert E.P. (2010) (digital release only)
