= Flying Squad (TV series) =

- Genre: Documentary
- Directed by: Robert Fleming
- Narrated by: Alexander John
- Country of origin: United Kingdom
- Original language: English
- No. of seasons: 1
- No. of episodes: 8

Production
- Producer: Robert Fleming
- Cinematography: Paul Williams
- Editor: Roger Shufflebottom
- Running time: 30 minutes
- Production company: Thames/Argo

Original release
- Network: ITV
- Release: 8 February 1989 – 16 January 1990

Flying Squad is a documentary television series broadcast in 1989 on the British ITV network. It was a joint production between Argo Productions and Thames Television. The series followed the elite unit known as the Flying Squad, part of London's Metropolitan Police Service.

== Episodes ==
The series consists of eight thirty-minute episodes broadcast in February and March 1989; however, one of the episodes was delayed for legal reasons and broadcast in January 1990. Each episode follows a particular Flying Squad operation in a fly-on-the-wall format through its planning stages to the conclusion. Many of the episodes featured suspects under police surveillance, planning and carrying out armed robberies, culminating in a pavement ambush by armed officers while offenders were in the act of committing the crime. Other episodes featured Flying Squad officers carrying out their daily duties.

The episodes are:

1. "Operation Boxer", originally broadcast 8 February 1989;
2. "Operation Pelican", originally broadcast 15 February 1989;
3. "Operation Jackdaw", originally broadcast 22 February 1989;
4. "Operation Turkey", originally broadcast 1 March 1989;
5. "Operation Night-Hawk", originally broadcast 8 March 1989;
6. "Operation Admiral", originally broadcast 15 March 1989;
7. "The Team at Tower Bridge", originally broadcast 22 March 1989; and
8. "Operation Dachshund", originally broadcast 16 January 1990 and delayed for legal reasons.

== "Operation Turkey" ==
One of the most memorable episodes, "Operation Turkey", features the theft of £10,000 in wages from a Bejam supermarket in Hare Street, Woolwich, on 23 November 1987. The robbery was set up by a police informant named Seamus Ray. Following the raid, robbers Ronnie Easterbrook and Tony Ash, and their getaway driver Gary Wilson drove to Sunbury Street, Woolwich, to swap cars. Flying Squad officers were already waiting there and ambushed the gang. In the gun battle, which took place close to Woolwich Fire Station, Tony Ash was shot dead by police; Ronnie Easterbrook and Gary Wilson both suffered gunshot wounds. One of the officers was wounded in the leg by shots from Easterbrook's gun.

Easterbrook was sentenced to whole life imprisonment. In 1997 and 1999, Easterbrook went on hunger strike over what he believed to be a miscarriage of justice in the shooting of Tony Ash by armed officers, suggesting the armed officers who arrested him had operated a shoot-to-kill policy. The hunger strikes continued and Easterbrook started several legal appeals through his solicitors and refused to accept the legality of his conviction. Despite these legal challenges, Ronnie Easterbrook died in HM Prison Gartree, Leicestershire, on 10 May 2009.

== Theme tune ==
Flying Squad is as much known for the haunting melody of its theme tune during the opening and closing credits as it was for its programme content. The opening sequence features a blue and black monochromatic animation of the wings of a bird of prey superimposed over real programme footage.

== Production team ==
The series was produced and directed by London-born director Robert Fleming, and narrated by Alexander John. Archive footage from the series is held in the archives of FremantleMedia. Some of the footage from the series was used in the 2010 series Flying Squad: The Real Sweeney, broadcast on the National Geographic Channel and including the footage of the shooting during Operation Turkey in 1987. The series was produced by the same production team that produced the television series Murder Squad.
