= Robert Pearsall =

Robert Pearsall may refer to:

- Robert Lucas Pearsall (1795–1856), English composer
- Robert Pearsall (architect) (1852–1929), English architect
- Robert Pearsall Smith (1827–1898), preacher
