= Lincoln Lynch =

RAF pilot and civil rights leader

Lincoln Orville Lynch
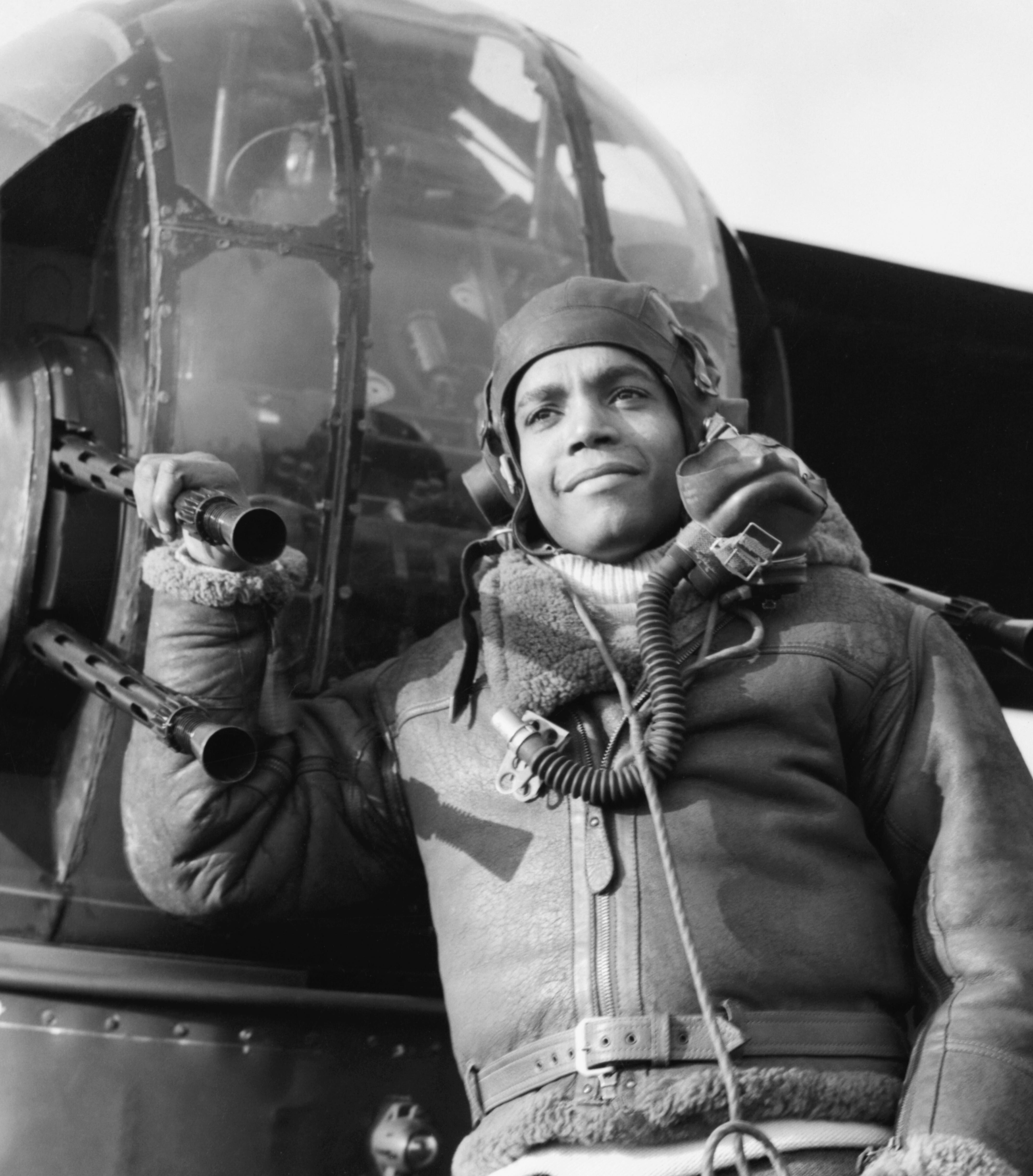
- Sergeant Lincoln Orville Lynch DFM by the rear turret of his Halifax at RAF Pocklington, February 1944
- Born: 1920; Jamaica
- Died: 22 October 2011 (aged 90–91); Long Island, New York, U.S.
- Military career
- Branch: Royal Air Force
- Service years: 1942–1951
- Rank: Flight Lieutenant
- Conflicts: Second World War
- Awards: Distinguished Flying Medal

Lincoln Orville Lynch (1920 – 22 October 2011) was a Jamaican-American civil rights activist and Royal Air Force veteran.

== RAF career ==
Lynch joined the Royal Air Force (RAF) as a volunteer in 1942. He received the Air Gunner's Trophy as the highest scoring cadet on his training course in Canada. He joined Bomber Command as a member of No. 102 Squadron RAF, and on his first operational flight he shot down a German Junkers Ju 88.

The historian Mark Johnson described this incident:

He was a gentleman. He shot the night fighter's engine with his machine guns, then he realised it was on fire and he then held fire while the German pilot and his crewmen climbed out and jumped off the back of the aeroplane and then he resumed firing and shot the rest of the aeroplane out of the sky.

In August 1944 he was promoted to Flight Sergeant, a rare promotion for a gunner. In September 1944 he was awarded the Distinguished Flying Medal. The citation noted his "high standard of determination and devotion to duty", exemplary conduct and declared him "a worthy member of a fine crew" who had "defended his aircraft with great skill on several occasions against enemy fighters".

In May 1947, Lynch was promoted to Flight Lieutenant.

== Civil rights activism ==
In 1951, Lynch left the RAF and emigrated to the United States, taking up a role as Airline Flight Operation Officer at Kennedy International Airport and settling on Long Island.

In 1962 when his children were denied access to a largely white Long Island elementary school, he took the school district to court. The failure of the case inspired Lynch to become "one of Long Island's most ardent and audacious civil rights activists". He became Chairman of the Long Island branch of the Congress of Racial Equality (LI CORE), organising protests against discriminatory housing practices and filing complaints with the State Commission for Human Rights. By 1963, LI CORE was engaged in boycotts, sit ins, demonstrations and pickets and Lynch and other members were frequently arrested. Lynch was one of the first civil rights leaders to speak against US involvement in the Vietnam War.

In the summer of 1964, Lynch was arrested for dumping a truckload of garbage at Riverhead town hall in protest at irregular refuse collection from immigrant housing. The same year, Lynch was part of a group showing the poor quality of local housing to the Executive Director of President Johnson's anti-poverty campaign. Lynch was arrested the following day and ultimately convicted of disorderly conduct. Lynch jumped in front of a fire truck at a demonstration calling for integration of Long Island Fire Services and put heavy pressure on Grumman, then Long Island's largest employer, to employ more African-American workers. In 1966 Lynch became Associate Director and Vice Chairman of CORE's national leadership, working alongside Floyd McKissick.

In 1967, Lynch resigned from CORE and joined the New York Urban Coalition as Vice President and formed the Alliance of Minority Group Leaders. In the 1970s he taught community organisation and activism at Stony Brook University and testified before Congress.

Lynch remained politically active and was one of many hundreds of people arrested during protests in Manhattan following the 1999 shooting of Amadou Diallo. He died of cancer in 2011.

== Popular culture ==
Lynch is depicted alongside Mary Seacole and George Arthur Roberts on products produced with the Black Farmer brand.
