= New Cross =

Coordinates: 51.4709°N 0.0337°W

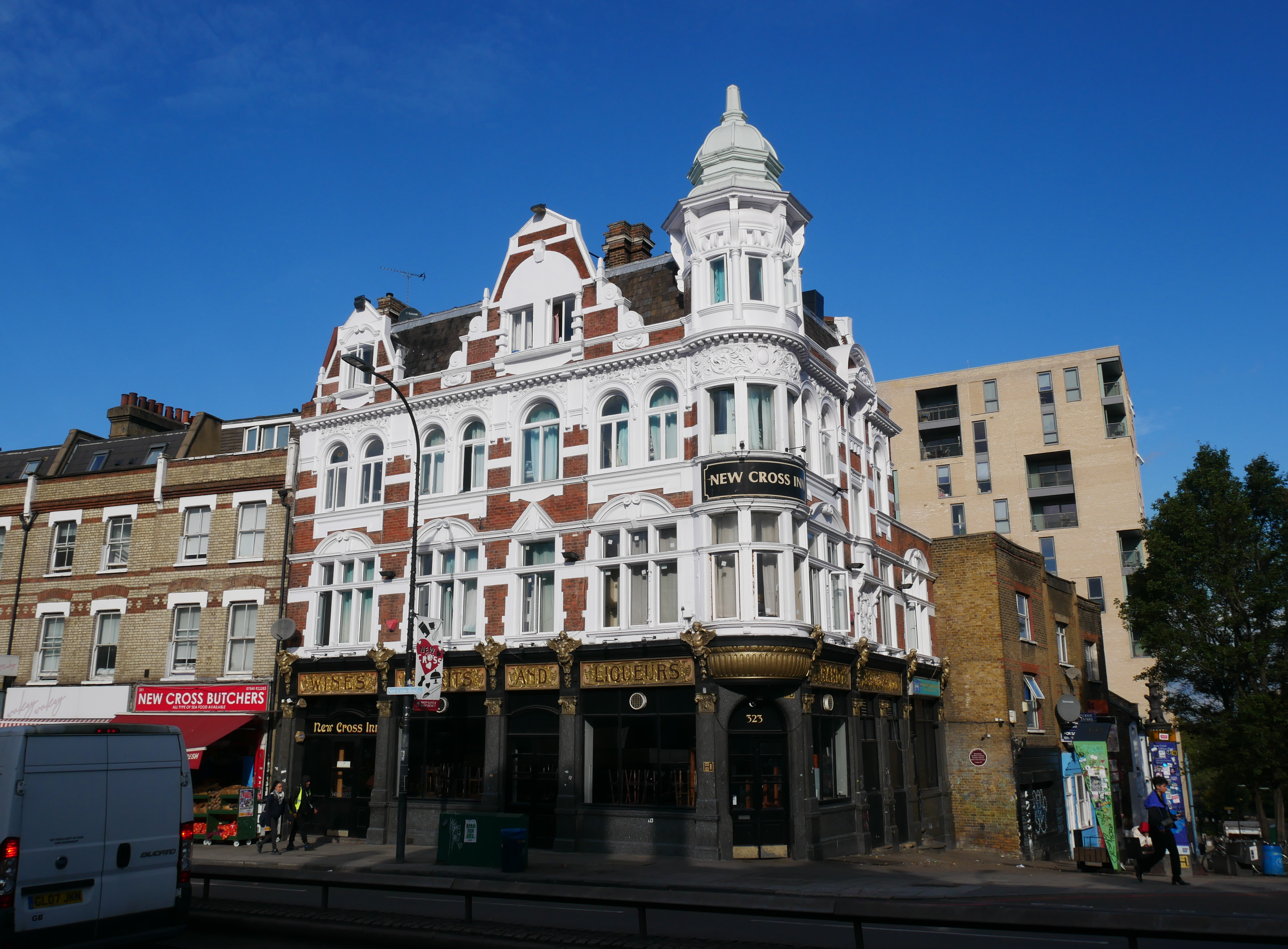
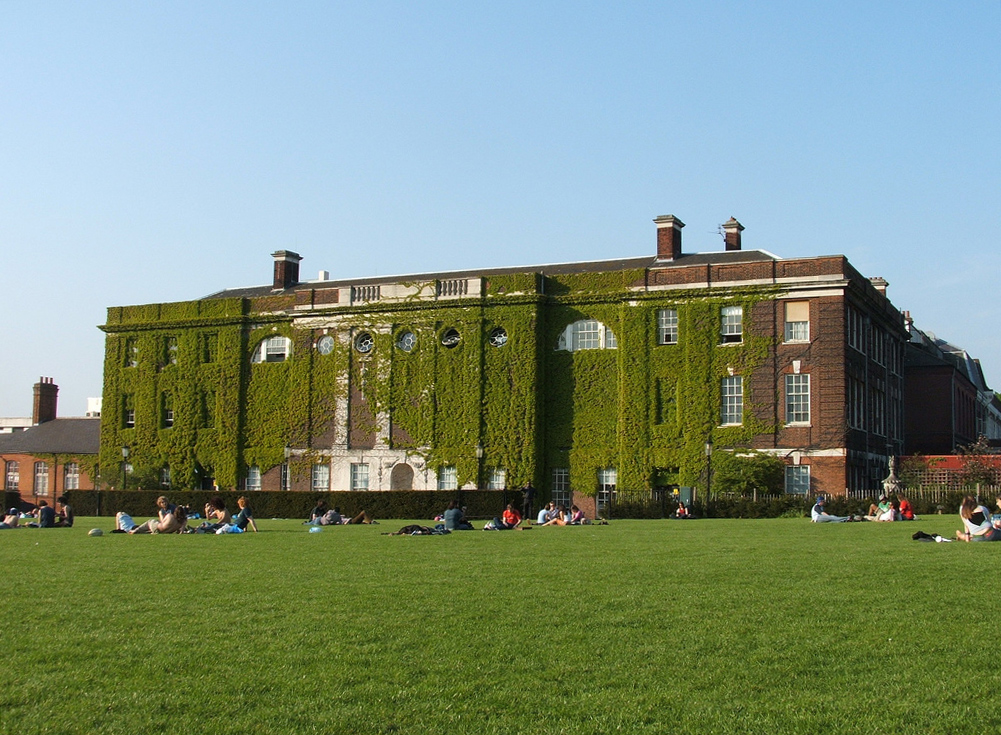
- New Cross Inn Goldsmiths University

- Location within Greater London
- Population: 15,756 (2011 Census.Ward)
- OS grid reference: TQ365765
- London borough: Lewisham
- Ceremonial county: Greater London
- Region: London
- Country: England
- Sovereign state: United Kingdom
- Post town: LONDON
- Postcode district: SE14, SE15
- Dialling code: 020
- Police: Metropolitan
- Fire: London
- Ambulance: London
- UK Parliament: Lewisham North
- London Assembly: Greenwich and Lewisham

New Cross is an area in south-east London, England, 4.5 miles (7.2 km) south-east of Charing Cross in the London Borough of Lewisham and the SE14 postcode district. New Cross is near St Johns, Telegraph Hill, Nunhead, Peckham, Brockley, Deptford and Greenwich. It is home to Goldsmiths, University of London; Haberdashers' Hatcham College, and Addey and Stanhope School.

New Cross Gate, on the west of New Cross, is named after the New Cross tollgate, established in 1718 by the New Cross Turnpike Trust. It is the location of New Cross station and New Cross Gate station. New Cross Gate corresponds to the manor and district formerly known as Hatcham.

== History ==
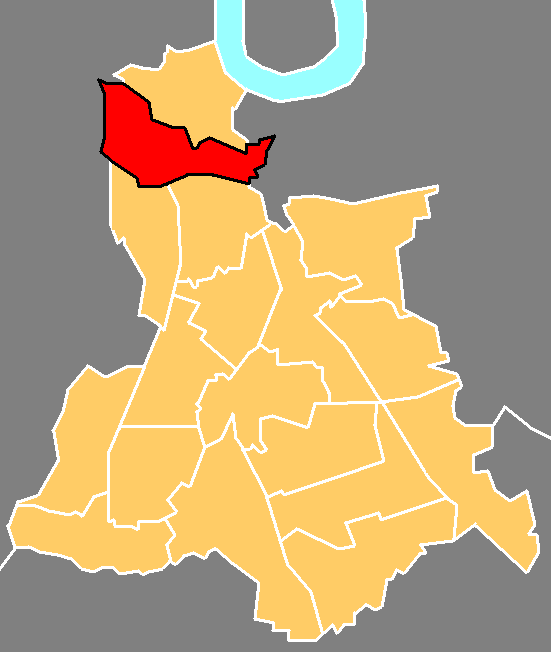
The electoral ward of New Cross (red) within the London Borough of Lewisham (orange)

The area was originally known as Hatcham (the name persists in the title of the Anglican parishes of St. James, Hatcham along with its school, and All Saints, Hatcham Park). The earliest reference to Hatcham is the Domesday Book of 1086 as Hacheham. It was held by the Bishop of Lisieux from the Bishop of Bayeux. According to the entry in the Domesday Book Hatcham's assets were: 3 hides; 3 ploughs, 6 acres (24,000 m^{2}) of meadow, woodland worth 3 hog and rendered £2.

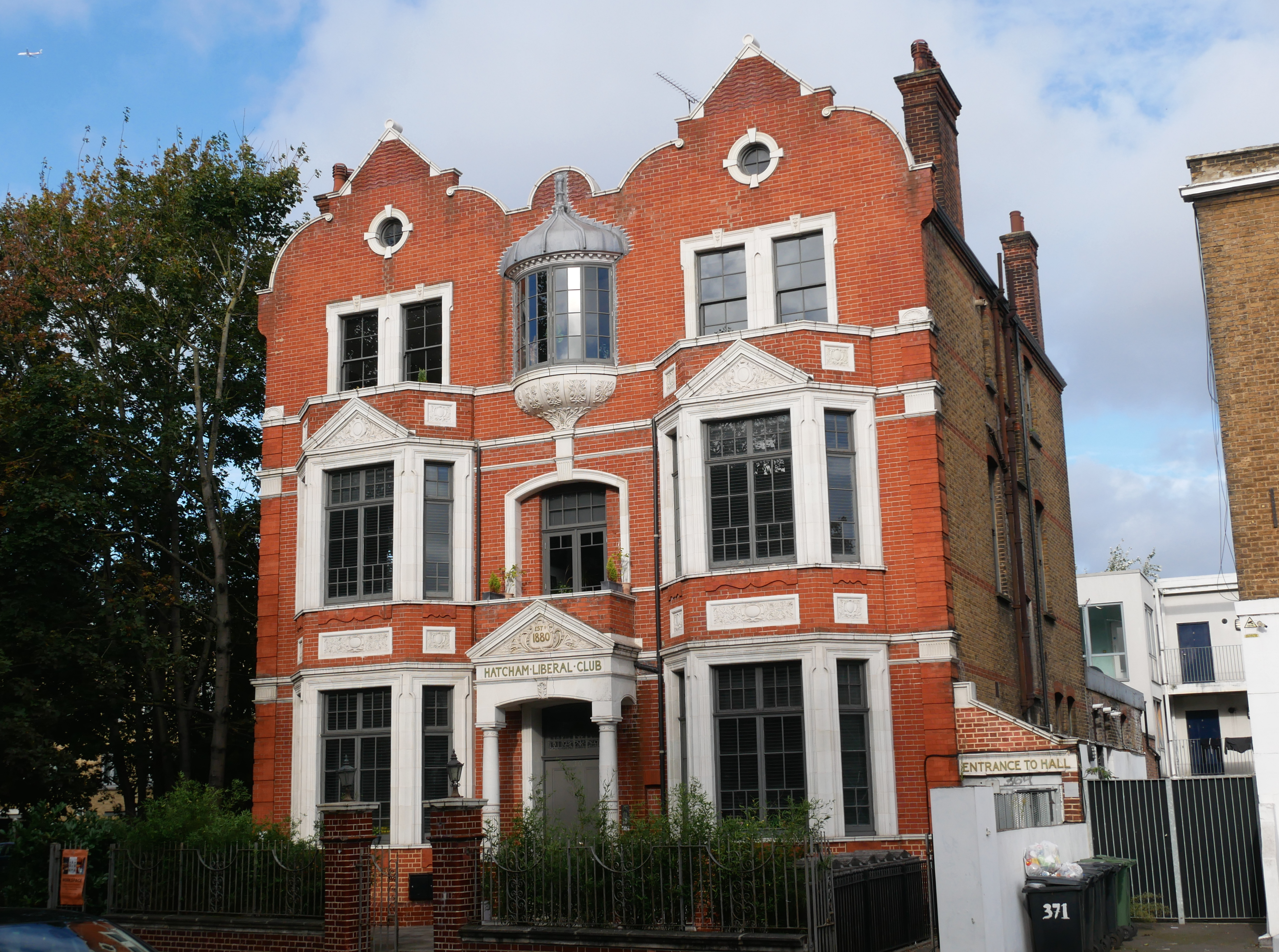
The Hatcham Liberal Club in New Cross, built circa 1880 and now Grade II listed

Hatcham tithes were paid to Bermondsey Abbey from 1173 until the dissolution of the monasteries. A series of individuals then held land locally before the manor was bought in the 17th century by the Haberdashers' Company, a wealthy livery company that was instrumental in the area's development in the 19th century. Telegraph Hill was for many years covered by market gardens also owned by the Worshipful Company of Haberdashers. Until the creation of the London County Council in 1889, the area was a part of the counties of Kent and Surrey.

New Cross is believed to have taken its name from a coaching house originally known as the Golden Cross, which stood close to the current New Cross House pub. The diarist John Evelyn, who lived in Deptford, wrote in 1675 that he met a friend at 'New Crosse' in his coach before travelling down through Kent and on to France.

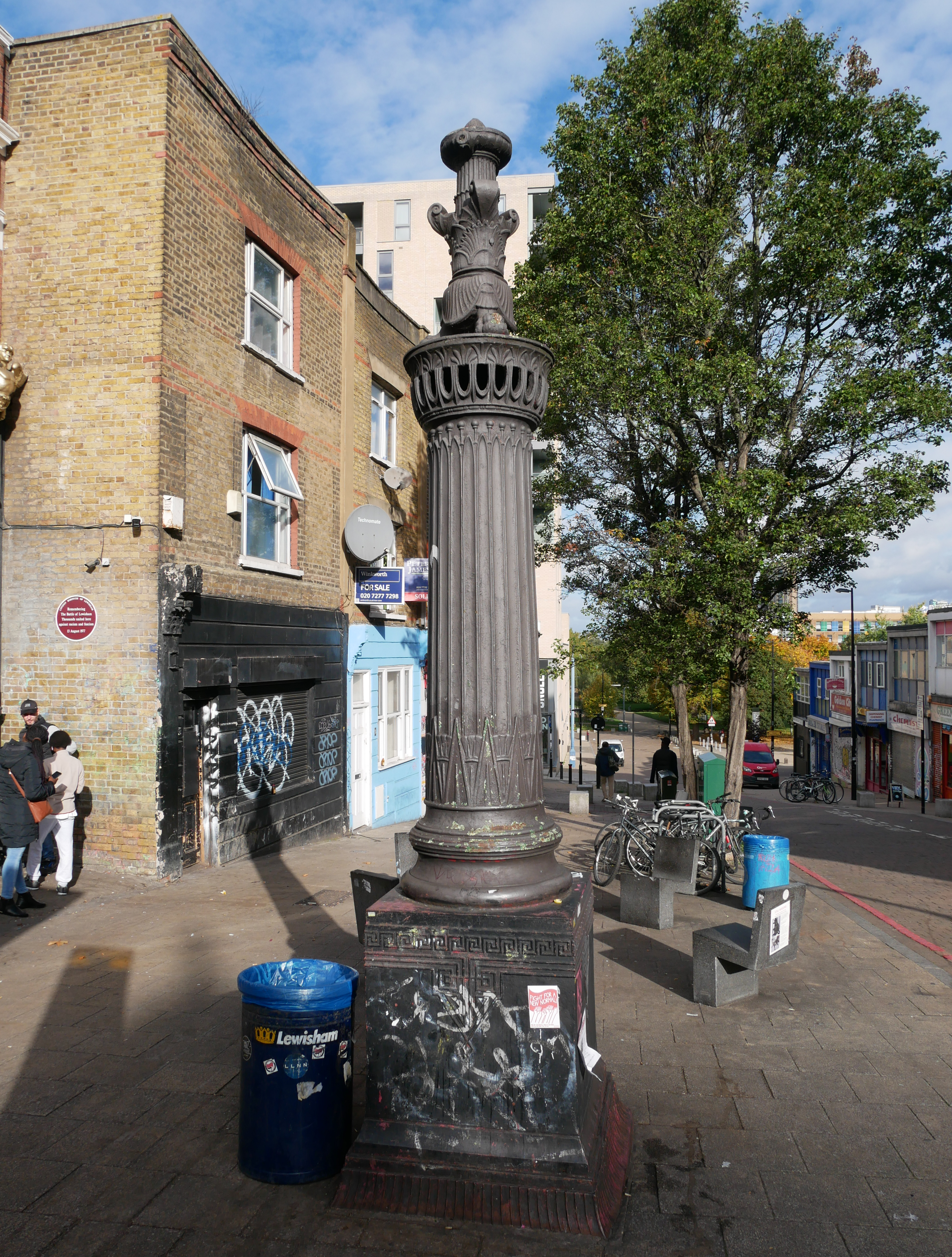
The Ventilating Column in New Cross, erected in 1897 and now Grade II listed

In the later 19th century, the area became known as the New Cross Tangle on account of its numerous railway lines, workshops and two stations — both originally called New Cross (one was later renamed New Cross Gate).

Hatcham Iron Works in Pomeroy Street was an important steam locomotive factory, the scene of a bitter confrontation in 1865 between its manager, George England, and the workers. The Strike Committee met at the Crown and Anchor pub in New Cross Road, now the site of Hong Kong City Chinese restaurant. George England's house, Hatcham Lodge, is now 56 Kender Street.

New Cross bus garage was formerly the largest tram depot in London, opening in 1906. During the 1926 General Strike in support of the miners, strikebreakers were brought in to drive trams from the depot. On 7 May, police baton charges were launched to clear a crowd of 2–3,000 pickets blockading the entrance (reported as "Rowdyism in New Cross" by the Kentish Mercury).

The last London tram, in July 1952, ran from Woolwich to New Cross. It was driven through enormous crowds, finally arriving at its destination in the early hours of 6 July.

On 25 November 1944 a V-2 rocket exploded at the Woolworths store in New Cross Road (on the site later occupied by an Iceland supermarket), 168 people were killed, and 121 were seriously injured. It was London's most devastating V-bombing of the entire war. On 25 November 2009 a new commemorative plaque was unveiled on the site by the Mayor of Lewisham, marking the 65th anniversary of the explosion.

On 13 August 1977, the area saw the so-called Battle of Lewisham, during which the far-right British National Front were beaten back by militant anti-fascists and local people.

On 18 January 1981, 13 young black people were killed in a house fire at a party. Suspicions that the fire was caused by a racist attack, and accusations of police indifference to the deaths, led to the largest ever political mobilisation of black people seen in the UK.

29 June 2008, two university students from France were stabbed to death in a house.

== Culture ==
=== Comedy ===
During the 1980s, the Goldsmiths Tavern hosted alternative cabaret nights, including the Parrot Cafe organised by Emma Cafferty and Nikky Smedley. It was the original venue of Vic Reeves Big Night Out, a live comedy night he started there in 1986 before moving it to the Albany Empire in 1988, and also where Reeves met future comedy partner Bob Mortimer. Paul O'Grady would also perform there.

A long-running comedy night named Happy Mondays runs at the Amersham Arms fortnightly. Comedians to have performed at the night include Stewart Lee, Cardinal Burns, Russell Howard, Shaparak Khorsandi, Andy Parsons, Andi Osho, Arthur Smith, Sarah Millican, Greg Davies, Milton Jones, Dane Baptiste, Robin Ince, and Al Murray.

=== Music ===
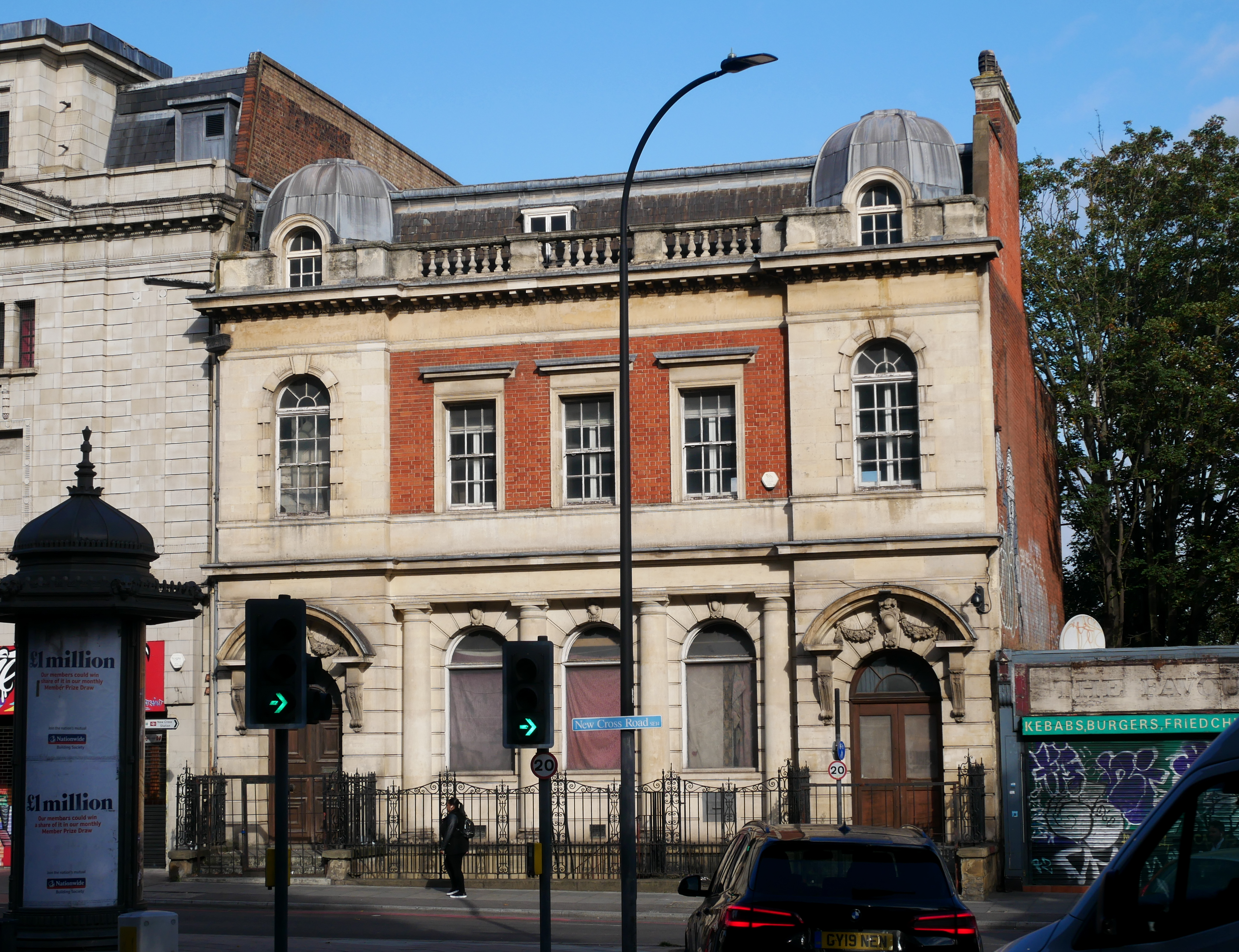
329 to 331 New Cross Road, built in 1903 and now Grade II listed

Goldsmiths' Students' Union had a reputation for putting on established and up and coming bands of the late 1970s and 1980s including Japan, Lloyd Cole and the Commotions, Wet Wet Wet and Levellers. Blur, some of the members of which met whilst studying at the university, played their second ever gig there while still called Seymour.

In the 1990s nightclub The Venue on Clifton Rise was central to the Indie rock and Brit Pop scenes and played host to gigs by Oasis, Blur, Pulp, Suede, The Verve, and Ocean Colour Scene.

Urban music magazine, Touch, and The Platform Magazine, an Islamic Hip-Hop journal are based in New Cross.

During the mid to late 2000s (around the time of new rave's popularity in the music press and the Angular Recording Corporation bringing attention to the area) the press briefly referred to The New Cross Scene, leading the Evening Standard to declare New Cross was "now officially cool" in 2007. Bands such as Bloc Party, Art Brut, and The xx played at pubs in the area early in their careers. Klaxons also formed whilst living in the area, and their original drummer's later band Hatcham Social were named after an old name for the area via a Liberal club on the New Cross end of the part of the A202 named Queen's Road.

In the 2010s and early 2020s the area was known for being a focal point of the London jazz revival scene, with club night Steam Down, and musicians like Nubya Garcia having gigged there and in nearby Deptford.

The area supports a fledgling student opera company, Opera Gold, run by Goldsmiths, University of London.

=== Sport ===
Millwall Football Club, founded by mainly Scottish workers at J.T. Morton, a cannery and food processing plant in Millwall on the Isle of Dogs in 1885, was based at The Den in Cold Blow Lane from 1910 to 1993. The ground attracted crowds of more than 45,000 at its peak, but by the 1980s was notorious for the club's repeated incidents of football hooliganism. Millwall moved a short distance to a new stadium, The New Den, situated off Ilderton Road and just within Bermondsey, at the start of the 1993–94 season. The club remains within the New Cross electoral ward.

Speedway racing was staged at the New Cross Speedway and Greyhound Stadium, situated at the end of Hornshay Street, off Ilderton Road. The venue became home to the New Cross Rangers in 1934 when the Crystal Palace promotion moved en bloc. The track, reputed to be one of the shortest and known as "The Frying Pan Bowl", operated until 1939 and re-opened in 1946 running until the early 1950s. The track re-opened for a short spell 1959 - 1961 and closed its doors to the sport for the last time mid season 1963. The stadium was also the scene of the UK's first stock car race at Easter 1954, with 26,000 in the crowd and thousands more locked outside. The stadium site is now an open space, Bridge House Meadows. The 1949 speedway film Once a Jolly Swagman, starring Dirk Bogarde, was filmed at New Cross.

=== Dance ===
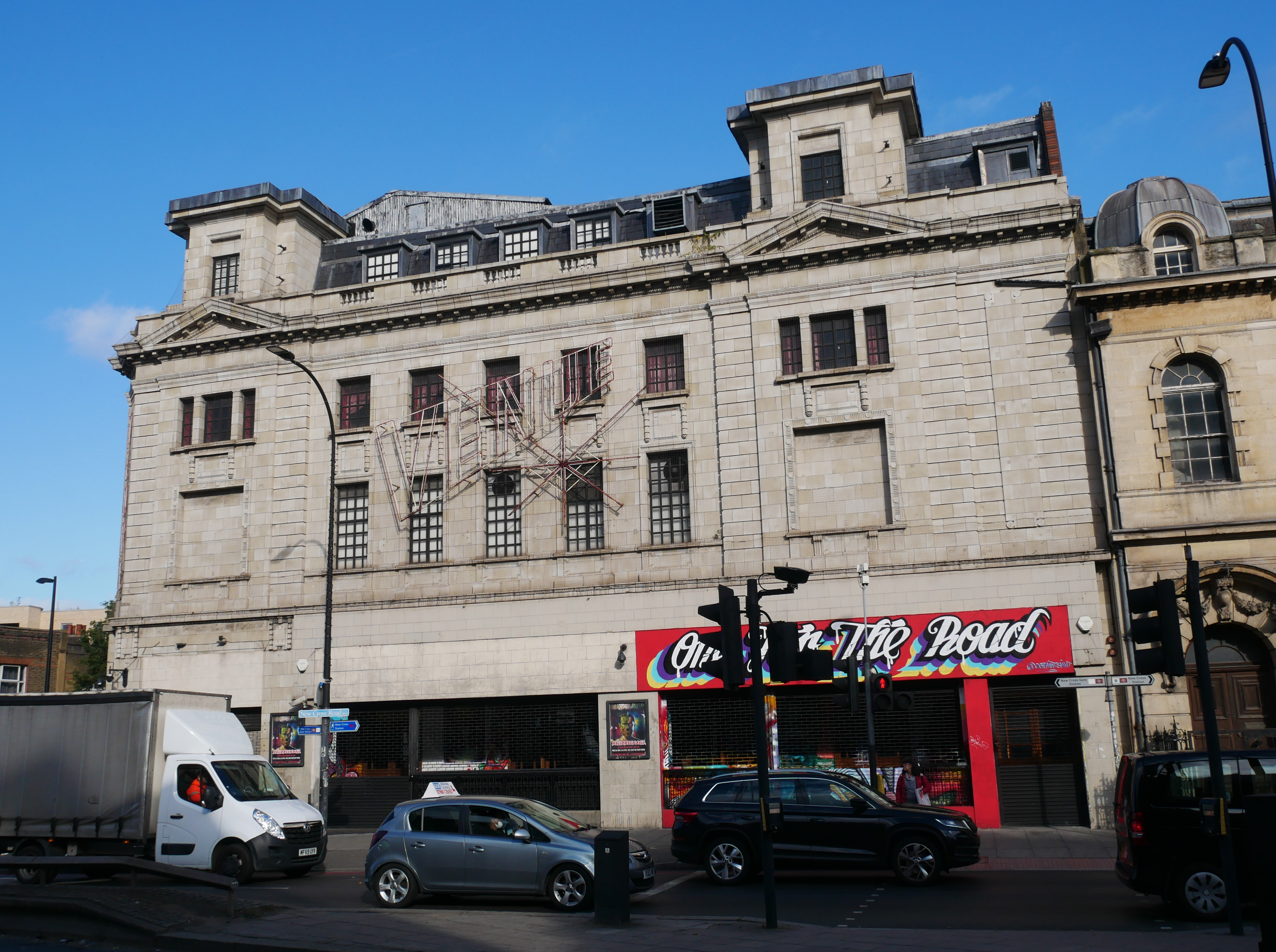
The Venue nightclub in New Cross

For many years New Cross was home to the Laban Centre, now Trinity Laban Conservatoire of Music and Dance which was based at Laurie Grove producing choreographers such as Matthew Bourne and Lea Anderson. In 2002 Laban moved to new studios in Deptford. However, it still uses its New Cross campus, where studios have since been refurbished.

=== Literature ===
Its library, New Cross Learning, which was formerly known as the New Cross People's Library, was saved from permanent closure after government cuts. A series of protests in 2011, namely from the ‘Save New Cross Library Campaign’ and the subsequent media coverage, garnered enough support to see it re-open in 2013 as a community led library. It now offers learning activities and workshops, and has a lending catalogue of over 5,000 books.

== Demography ==
The New Cross ward of Lewisham has the lowest female life expectancy of all the wards of Greater London: 77.6 years. For males the rate was 74.3 years, tied with Camberwell Green in Southwark and only higher than Selhurst ward in Croydon.

== Buildings ==
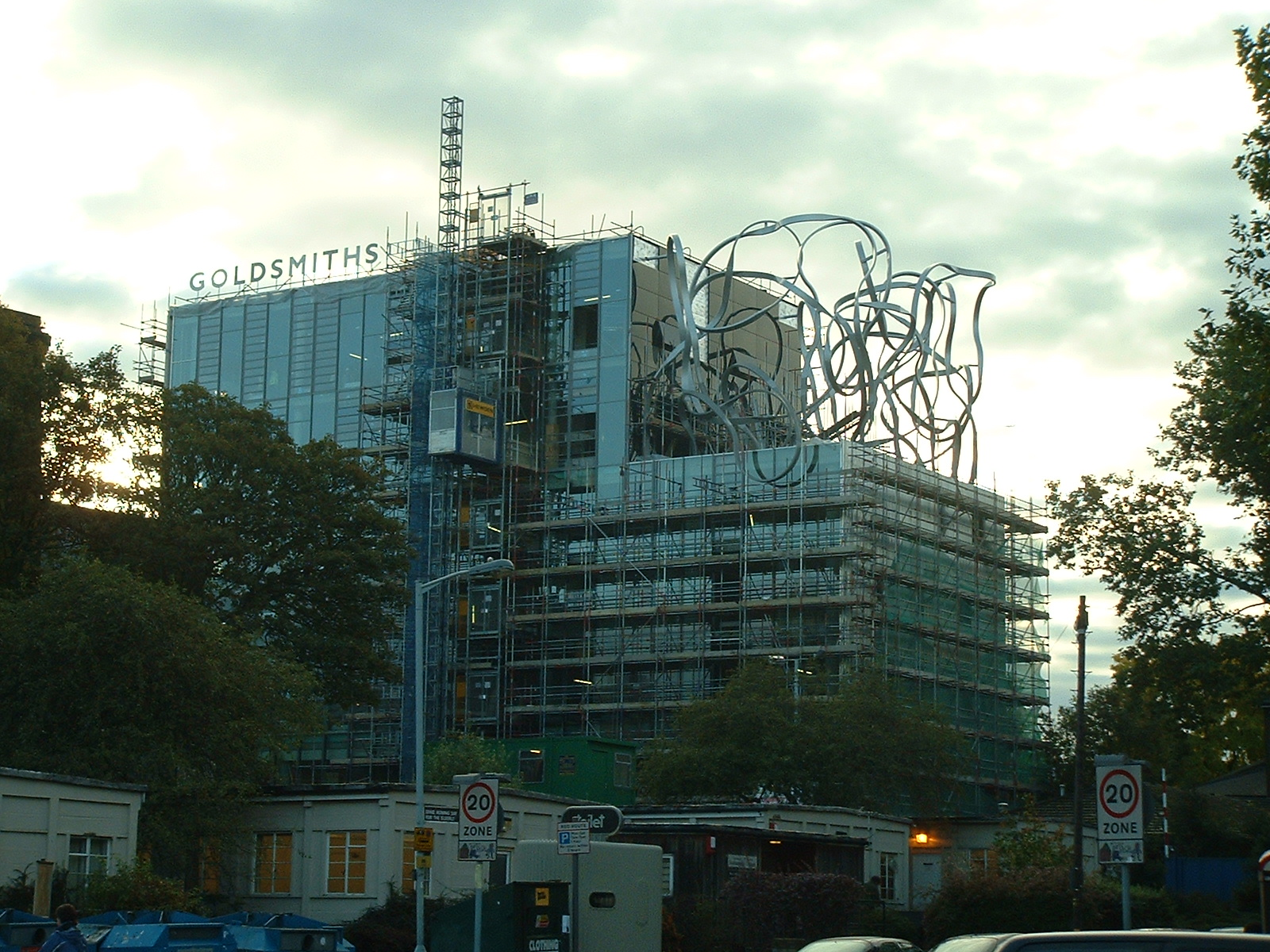
Ben Pimlott Building

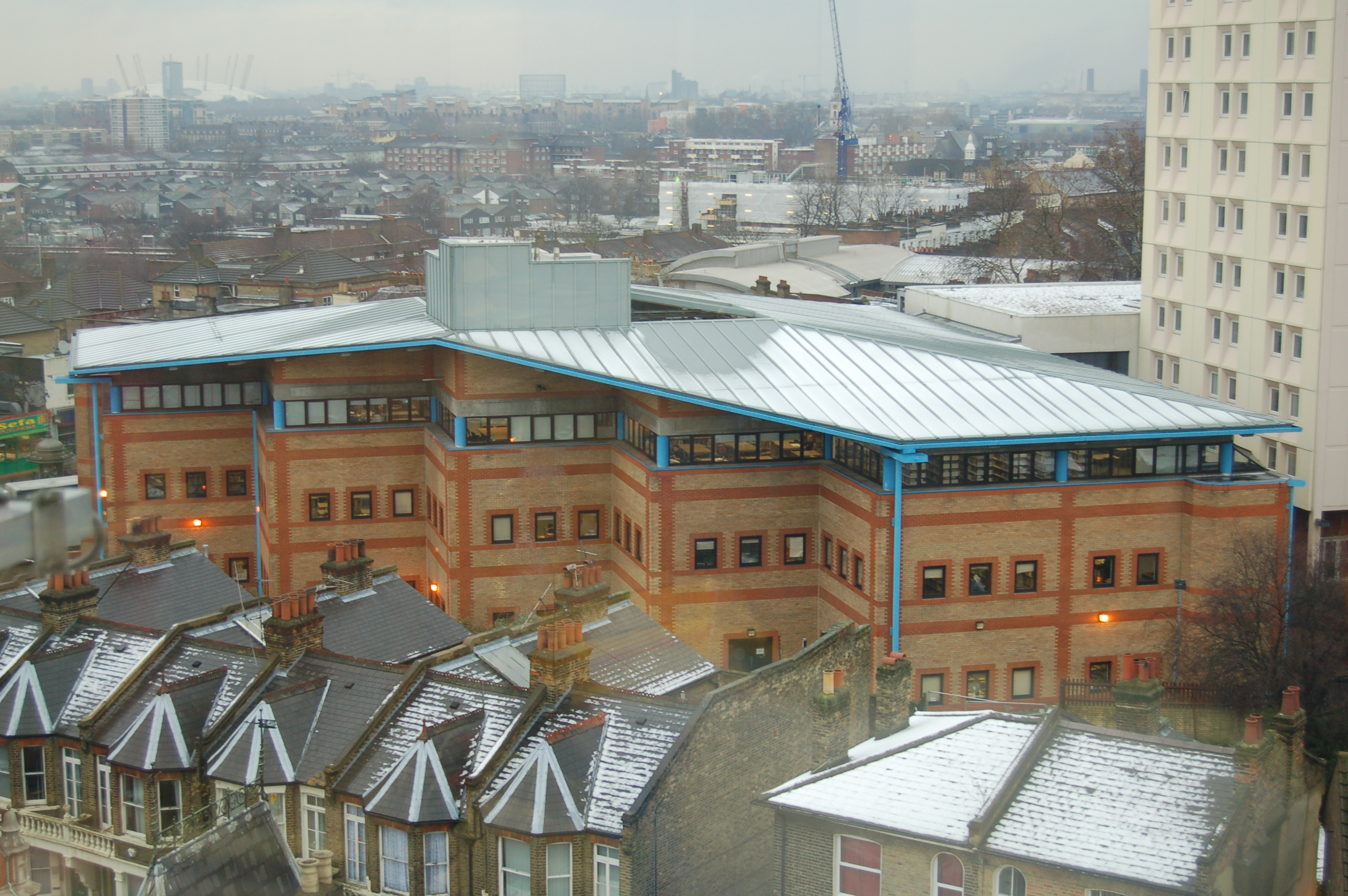
Goldsmith's Library

The proximity of New Cross to Deptford and Greenwich, both of which have strong maritime connections, led to the establishment of the Royal Naval School in New Cross in 1843 (designed by architect John Shaw Jr, 1803–1870) to house "the sons of impecunious naval officers". The school relocated further south-east to Mottingham in 1889, and the former school building was bought by the Worshipful Company of Goldsmiths, who opened the Goldsmiths’ Company's Technical and Recreative Institute in 1891. This was in turn handed over to the University of London in 1904 and is now Goldsmiths, University of London.

The former Deptford Town Hall building in New Cross Road, now also used by Goldsmiths, was built in the Edwardian Baroque style by Lanchester and Rickards, 1903–5. Nautical references include carvings of Tritons, statues of admirals and a sailing ship weathervane on the clock turret.

New Cross Fire Station is a Grade II listed building at 266 Queens Road, built in 1893–94 to a design by the architect Robert Pearsall.

The Kingdom Hall of Jehovah's Witnesses was once the South East London Synagogue. It was established in 1888 by Ashkenazi Jews who had emigrated to Britain from Eastern Europe. It was refused membership of the United Synagogue, but was admitted to the Federation of Synagogues. Immanuel Jakobovits was the rabbi just after the Second World War. The synagogue's first premises was a house at 452 New Cross Road. The first purpose-built synagogue was consecrated in March 1905 and was destroyed by a German air raid on 27 December 1940. After this the congregation moved temporarily to 117 Lewisham Way, returning to its original site at New Cross Road in 1946 – first to a temporary hut and then to a new purpose-built synagogue in 1956. During the period from 1945 to 1947 Immanuel Jakobovits, who later became the Chief Rabbi of the United Hebrew Congregations of the Commonwealth, and was created a life peer in 1988, as Baron Jakobovits, was the rabbi. However, the congregation went into decline and the synagogue closed in 1985, by which time it only had 56 male members compared with 294 in 1939.

The Venue nightclub in New Cross Road has a long history as a place of entertainment. It opened as the New Cross Super Kinema in 1925, with a cinema on the ground floor and the New Cross Palais de Danse above, as well as a cafe. The name was shortened to New Cross Kinema from 1927, the plain Kinema in 1948, and finally Gaumont in 1950. It closed in August 1960, and remained derelict for some time. Part of the building was demolished before the old dancehall became The Harp Club and then The Venue in the late 1980s. The Venue nightclub briefly renamed itself 'One For The Road' and following the outbreak of the COVID-19 pandemic, and for a little while functioned less as a nightclub and more as a bar, before ultimately closing.

Also, the Duke of Albany public house (converted to flats in 2008) was the facade for The Winchester pub in the film Shaun of the Dead.

== Transport ==
=== Rail ===
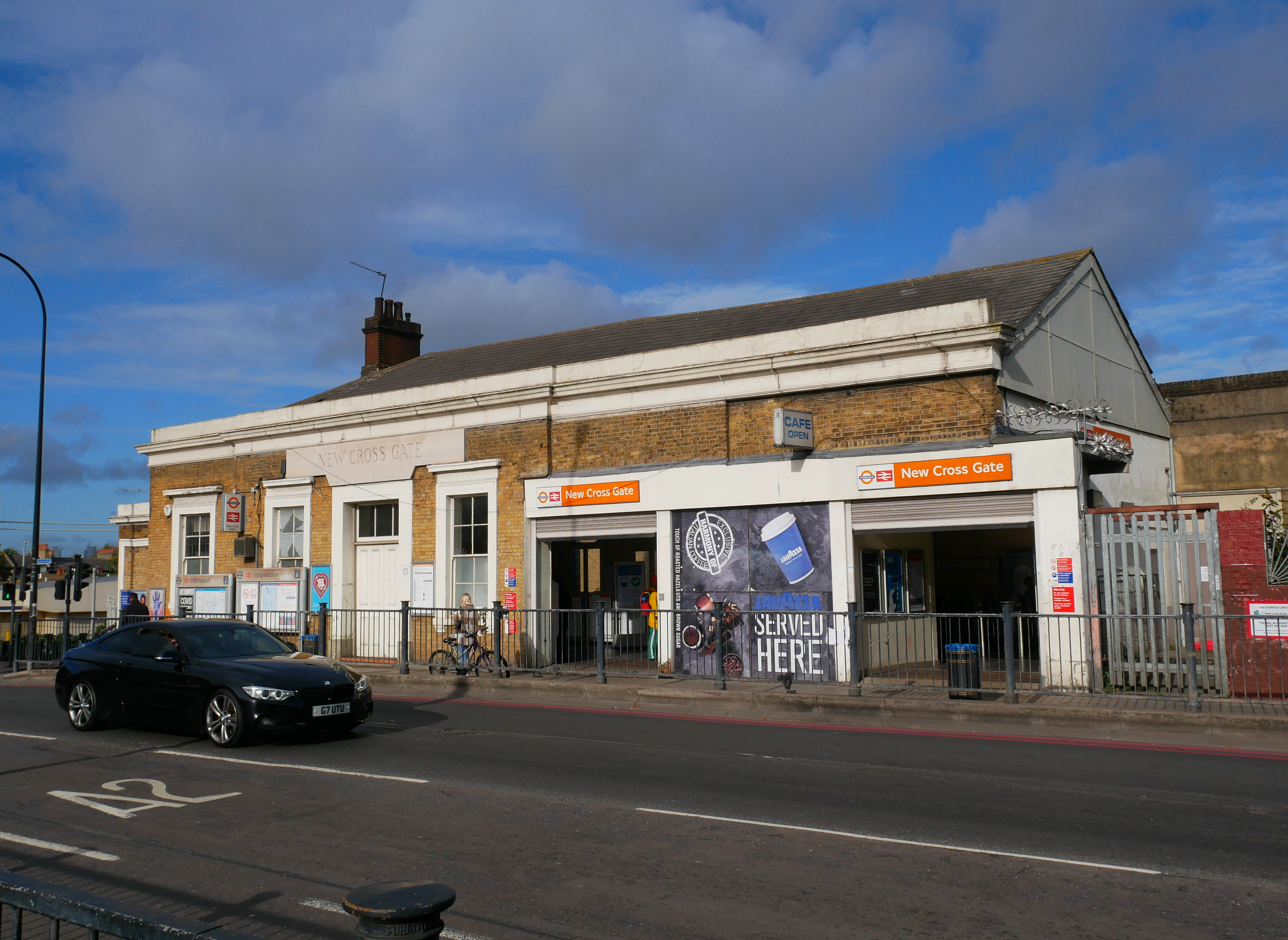
New Cross Gate Railway Station

The area is served by two railway stations, New Cross and New Cross Gate.

Both stations are served by London Overground and both are on the network's Windrush line. From New Cross Gate passengers can travel to Crystal Palace and West Croydon to the south and Highbury & Islington to the north. New Cross acts as the terminus for the service from Dalston Junction. Trains sometimes continue to Highbury & Islington but this is more common during engineering works. Passengers can easily make a brief interchange at Dalston Junction for trains to Highbury and Islington

New Cross also has mainline suburban services operated by Southeastern. Trains generally run north to Cannon Street or Charing Cross to the north and south-east to Lewisham, Bexleyheath, Hayes and Dartford in Kent.

New Cross Gate has mainline suburban services operated by Southern. Trains here generally run north to London Bridge and south to London Victoria, East Croydon, Gatwick Airport Surrey and Sussex.

=== Roads ===
Three major roads meet in New Cross: the A202 (Queen's Road) which runs from New Cross to Victoria, the A2 (New Cross Road) which runs from London to Canterbury and Dover, and the A20 (Lewisham Way) which runs from New Cross to Folkestone and Dover.

== Notable residents ==
=== Music connections ===
- Bands such as Art Brut, Bloc Party, Blur, The Rocks, The Hancocks, Klaxons, Luxembourg, Indigo Moss and Athlete have all originated and been associated with the "New Cross scene".
- British hip-hop producer JFlames grew up in Woodpecker estate and attended Deptford Green school.
- British hip-hop artist Blade did most of his recording in the area, selling his records personally on the streets there and often name checking it in his songs.
- 1970s glam rocker Steve Harley grew up in Fairlawn Mansions, New Cross, going to Edmund Waller and Haberdashers' Aske's schools.
- Music hall star Marie Lloyd lived in Lewisham Way from 1887 to 1893.
- Nathan Cooper and Chi-Tudor Hart, out of the electro group Matinée Club grew up in New Cross.
- RnB group Damage. Two members of the group attended St James Hatcham C of E Primary School situated on St James in New Cross Gate.
- The folk noir band Songdog lived in New Cross for a year or so after first moving to London from Wales. The transition period was difficult for the band members as they suffered from acute homesickness and for a time had rats, no hot water and no money, but frontman Lyndon Morgans says they took heart from the motto "Take Courage" (Courage being a brewery), which was emblazoned across the front of the Amersham Arms, a pub overlooking New Cross Station.
- Dire Straits lived in Deptford and performed some of their earliest gigs in New Cross pubs.
- Jools Holland performed and practised in pubs in New Cross at the beginning of his career.
- The Band of Holy Joy was formed in New Cross in 1984.
- British dance-pop artist Jessie Ware resides in New Cross with her husband and three children.
- P Money, (b. 1989), British rapper, MC, and songwriter.

=== Other local links ===
- Poet Robert Browning lived in Telegraph Cottage near New Cross Road during the 1840s
- Trade unionist, Eddie Dempsey, born and raised in New Cross
- Playwright and author Terence Frisby of the 1960s play and movie There's a Girl in My Soup was born in New Cross in 1932 but spent the majority of his childhood in Welling.
- Politician Sir Isaac Hayward, leader of the London County Council, represented the Deptford division
- Harry Mullan, boxing writer, lived in New Cross from the late 1960s to 1990s.
- Wrestler Mick McManus was born in New Cross.
- Actress Laila Morse (Gary Oldman's sister) who plays "Mo Harris" in EastEnders lives in New Cross.
- Actor Gary Oldman was born and raised in New Cross, attending Monson Primary School. His film Nil By Mouth is loosely based on his life growing up in south-east London and was largely filmed in the area.
- Footballer Kieran Richardson, former player for Fulham FC, spent some of his childhood in New Cross Gate
- Fr. Arthur Tooth SSC, an Anglican priest, was the Vicar of St. James', Hatcham in the 1870s and, whilst he was there, was prosecuted for ritualist practices — an event that became nationally famous at the time.
- Sir Barnes Wallis lived at 241 New Cross Road (on the corner of Nettleton Road) from 1892 to 1909.
- Artist Edward Henry Windred (1875–1953) lived at 352 New Cross Road during the 1930s
- Steve Wright (radio presenter)
- Former Goldsmiths students include Graham Sutherland, John Cale, Mary Quant, Malcolm McLaren, Damien Hirst, Sam Taylor-Wood, Lucian Freud, Antony Gormley, Julian Opie, Hisham Matar, Linton Kwesi Johnson, Neil Innes, Brian Molko, Alex James, and Graham Coxon.
- Princess Beatrice of York attended Goldsmiths, University of London as a B.A. (History) student, although she did not actually reside in New Cross.

== Places nearby ==
- Bermondsey
- Blackheath
- Brockley
- Deptford
- Greenwich
- Lewisham
- Rotherhithe
- Southwark
- Nunhead
- Peckham
- Telegraph Hill (Part of New Cross)
- Crofton Park

== In song ==
- Carter USM wrote a song called "The Only Living Boy in New Cross" (1992). The song lists the diverse youth tribes that bought their records whilst the title is a play on a Simon & Garfunkel song "The Only Living Boy in New York".
- The tragic New Cross fire was commemorated in a number of reggae songs and poems at the time, including Johnny Osbourne's "13 dead and nothing said", Benjamin Zephaniah's "13 dead", UB40's "Don't Let It Pass You By" and Linton Kwesi Johnson's "New Crass Massakkah".
