= Ronald Easterbrook =

Convicted armed robber (1931–2009)

Ronald Leonard Easterbrook (11 May 1931 – 10 May 2009) was a convicted armed robber and career criminal. Easterbrook was best known for a hunger strike in November 1987, which he did in protest after being convicted of armed robbery in Woolwich, London.

== Early life ==
Ronald Leonard Easterbrook, better known as Ronnie Easterbrook, was born on 11 May 1931 in London, England to William Henry Easterbrook and Caroline Pegg. In the 1911 census, Easterbrook's father, William, was described as a "carman" (the driver of a goods vehicle or horse-drawn cart). Ronald was born into a working class family and grew up in Deptford, an area of London, with 10 siblings.

When he left school at the age of 14, Easterbrook started working as a driver of a "tipper lorry" (dump truck) earning 2 pounds and 10 shillings a week. Despite this wage, he was constantly in need of cash, and often borrowing money. After this, In between doing manual labour jobs on building sites, Easterbrook started committing burglaries and other petty crimes. Easterbrook received his first conviction in 1946 when he was 15 years old.

== Borstal ==
In 1949, Ronald Easterbrook spent some time at Hewell Grange, which was a borstal at the time. In Ron Farquhar's autobiography, A Journey of Awakening, Farquhar writes how he met Ron Easterbrook whilst at the borstal. Farquhar was working in the Army Cadet Officer's club. When he was tidying up at the end of the day, he would take any leftover cakes to Easterbrook, who was working as a stoker in the boiler room.

== Early crimes ==
Some of the crimes that Easterbrook was involved with are recorded in newspapers of the day. The Evening Times reports a conviction for assault with intent to cause grievous bodily harm, after wounding two men with a piece of broken glass.

The Evening Times reports in a later story regarding three counts of breaking and entering. One of these alleged that Easterbrook broke into the Artillery Museum, which at the time was located at the Rotunda in Woolwich, and stole six firearms valued at £81 that were the property of the Queen.

The Glasgow Herald reports a conviction for receiving stolen goods, a stolen hat and overcoat.

An article in Police Review reports Easterbrook as having been convicted for assaulting a policeman with a lead-loaded rubber hose, and later for stabbing a man with a carving knife.

== Bickley burglary ==
Easterbrook's first conviction for armed robbery came in 1958, whilst he was working as a bricklayer and living in Deptford, London.

At around 8.00pm, on 29 March 1958, Easterbrook, who was armed with a gun, was burgling a house in Bickley in the London Borough of Bromley. Police had been alerted to the burglary and dispatched Henry Stevens to investigate. Stevens spotted Easterbrook climbing over a wooden fence, then began chasing him along St. Georges Road, Bickley. As Stevens was gaining on Easterbrook, Easterbrook turned and pointed a gun before saying "Stop, or you'll get this". Ignoring the warning, Stevens continued the chase and Easterbrook opened fire, shooting Stevens in the face.

The .22 calibre bullet ricocheted off Stevens teeth before embedding itself in his tongue. Despite having been shot, Stevens managed to grab hold of Easterbrook and force him up against some iron railings at the side of a railway bridge. During the struggle, Stevens managed to twist the gun from Easterbrook's hand, but Easterbrook pulled free. Stevens grabbed hold of the back of Easterbrook's overcoat, and started getting dragged behind Easterbrook. Then, Easterbrook took off his overcoat and jacket while running, causing Stevens to fall to the ground. Easterbrook then escaped over the railway bridge.

The coat and jacket were later used to help identify Easterbrook. The officer, Henry Stevens, was also able to identify Easterbrook from photographs shown to him whilst he was in hospital.

The case was heard at the Old Bailey court building in London on 13 May 1958. Easterbrook was initially charged with attempted murder but was acquitted due to lack of evidence suggesting he ever intended to kill the officer. Easterbrook was instead convicted of the lesser charge of Grievous bodily harm and intent to resist arrest. He was sentenced to 10 years.

In the conclusion of the trial, the judge said "You are in my view a wicked and dangerous man".

The officer Henry Stevens was later awarded the George Cross for gallantry during this event.

== Criminal record ==
Ronald Easterbrook received two further convictions. The first was in 1968, when he carried out an armed robbery with a pistol and short-barrelled shotgun. For this, he received a 13-year sentence. After his release in 1981, he was convicted of conspiracy to rob security guards of £40,000 and possession of an automatic pistol with intent to commit an indictable offence, for which he was sentenced to 3 years.

== The Woolwich robbery ==
In November 1987, Easterbrook was involved in the robbery of wages from a supermarket in Woolwich, London. He was with a second armed robber and a getaway driver. The robbery itself was carried out by the second robber, entering the store and holding a loaded revolver to the shop assistant's head, before demanding they hand over a cash bag containing £10,400. Ron Easterbrook, who was also armed with a revolver, kept watch outside. Following the robbery both men fled the scene in the getaway car, and drove to a point approximately a mile away, where they planned to change vehicles.

The police, who had been tipped off about the robbery, were lying in wait at the planned second point to ambush. Gunshots were exchanged in the street in front of Woolwich Fire Station. During the gunfight, Easterbrook's other robber was shot dead by police. Easterbrook fired six shots from a revolver, one of which hit a police officer in the leg. Both Easterbrook and the getaway driver were wounded by police bullets, then immediately arrested.

The event was captured on film by a film crew from Thames Television who were filming for the documentary series Flying Squad. Footage from the scene was broadcast in 1989. Footage of the arrest is also shown in the 2010 documentary series Flying Squad: The Real Sweeney, shown on the National Geographic Channel.

== Trial and conviction ==
Following the Woolwich raid, Easterbrook appeared in court. For his defence, Easterbrook instructed his barrister to claim that Flying Squad officers were operating a "shoot-to-kill" policy: alleging that the officers had opened fire first, and as such, he had only returned fire in self-defence. His barrister refused to employ this defence due to its political nature. Easterbrook then chose to defend himself.

On 30 November 1988, Easterbrook was convicted of robbery, wounding with intent, possession of firearms with intent to endanger life, and possession of ammunition with intent to endanger life, at the Old Bailey court in London. He was sentenced to life imprisonment. It was the first time an armed robber had been given a life sentence.

== Appeal ==
Ronald Easterbrook always maintained that his arrest had been a conspiracy between the police and an informant. Easterbrook also believed that the police had operated a shoot-to-kill policy. Easterbrook maintains that the other robber at the scene been trying to submit to the officers when he was shot dead. Easterbrook believed that since he had not been able to put forward this defence and did not have legal counsel, he had not received a fair trial.

In June 1990, the Court of Appeal refused Easterbrook's application for leave to appeal against his conviction. The court of appeal also rejected his appeal against his sentence. During the hearing, Easterbrook was not represented by any legal counsel.

On 9 December 1992, a certificate was issued on behalf the Secretary of State informing Easterbrook that his release would be at the discretion of the Home Secretary following a favourable recommendation by a parole board and after consultation with the Lord Chief Justice. The Home Office policy at the time was that no life prisoner would be detained more than 17 years without a review from the parole board.

Later in 1995, Easterbrook was held in the segregation unit of HMP Whitemoor after beginning a dirty protest against his own conviction. In 1997, Easterbrook conducted his first hunger strike, refusing to eat solids for 9 months.

On 5 February 1998, the Home Secretary agreed to certify that Easterbrook be subject to the arrangements of discretionary life prisoners, and his tariff was reduced to 16 years. After a further application this was reduced to 12½ years by the Home Secretary and the Lord Chief Justice, and therefore would expire in May 2000.

In November 1999, Easterbrook began his second hunger strike, which lasted for three months.

When Easterbrook's tariff expired in May 2000, he became eligible for parole. He still believed that The Crown had breached his rights, and because he was prohibited from putting forward a political defence, he had not received a fair trial. Therefore, he refused to take part in the parole process.

In 2003, whilst at HMP High Down in Surrey, Easterbrook, with a solicitor, took the case to the European Court of Human Rights in Strasbourg. The European Court of Human Rights ruled that Easterbrook's tariff fixing procedure had been in breach of article VI of the convention. The court also ruled that the delay in fixing Easterbrook's tariff breached articles IV and V.

Despite this ruling by the European Court of Human Rights, Easterbrook still refused to take part in the parole process and remained in prison until 2009 where he died. The decisions made by the European Court of Human Rights in the case of Ronald Easterbook have had a direct result on the setting of tariffs for convicted criminals.
