= Wilfred Emmanuel-Jones =

British businessman and farmer (born 1957)

Wilfred Emmanuel-Jones MBE (born 7 November 1957) is a British businessman, farmer, and founder of "The Black Farmer" range of food products. He was an unsuccessful Conservative Party candidate for the Chippenham constituency for the 2010 general election.

== Early life ==
Emmanuel-Jones was born in Clarendon, Jamaica, but in 1961 he moved with his parents to the United Kingdom. They settled in Small Heath in Birmingham, where he was one of nine children living in a small terrace house.

== Professional career ==
=== Television ===
After working in the catering industry Emmanuel-Jones enrolled on a training scheme that led to a job working for Peter Bazalgette on the BBC television series Food and Drink. He later continued to work in television, as a producer and director for 15 years and appeared in the Robert Llewellyn production Carpool on 22 January 2010.

Cameron's Black Tory, shown on Channel 4 after the General Election on 6 June 2010, filmed Emmanuel-Jones over a four-year period in his bid to become the Conservative Party MP for the nominally Liberal Democrat seat of Chippenham.

=== Farming ===
Emmanuel-Jones' television career gave him the capital to buy Higher West Kitcham Farm, on the border of Devon and Cornwall in St Giles on the Heath, Launceston, which he continues to farm. He became known to the locals who helped him initially with farming as "The Black Farmer", which inspired him to set up the brand of the same name, whose products include awarding-winning sausages, chicken, ham and sauces.

Danny Clarke, a British horticulturalist, inspired by the success of the Black Farmer, nicknamed himself the Black Gardener thus giving himself professional visibility.

Emmanuel-Jones has become involved in setting up the Black Farmer Scholarship, which aims to help and encourage ethnic minorities to work in the rural community, an area where to date they have been under-represented. This aim has been made into a Channel 4 TV series, Young Black Farmers, a series of three, which sees him take a group of nine inner-city school leavers from ethnic minorities on a scholarship on his Devon farm.

=== Business ===
Emmanuel-Jones set up a marketing agency in London, specializing in food brands, including Loyd Grossman, Kettle Chips and Plymouth Gin.

=== Honours ===
Emmanuel-Jones was awarded an honorary doctorate in marketing in 2012 by Plymouth University.

He was appointed Member of the Order of the British Empire (MBE) in the 2020 New Year Honours for services to British farming.

Since 2022 he has been an Independent Governor on the Governing Council of the Royal Agricultural University.

== Politics and personal life ==
Emmanuel-Jones failed to win the Chippenham constituency in the 2010 general election for the Conservative Party.

He revealed on Question Time that he voted to leave the EU in the 2016 EU referendum.

Emmanuel-Jones is married and the couple have a son and a daughter. He has an adult son from his first marriage.

== Popular culture ==
Lincoln Lynch is depicted alongside Mary Seacole and George Arthur Roberts on products produced with the Black Farmer brand.

== Bibliography ==
- Passed/Failed: An education in the life of Wilfred Emmanuel-Jones, farmer and Conservative candidate The Independent, 16 November 2006.
- Sustainbility Southwest
- A tale of two Tories BBC News, 29 September 2006.
- Save the Train
