= Vine and Bell Cottage =

Building in Fulham, London, England

Coordinates: 51.476858°N 0.204103°W

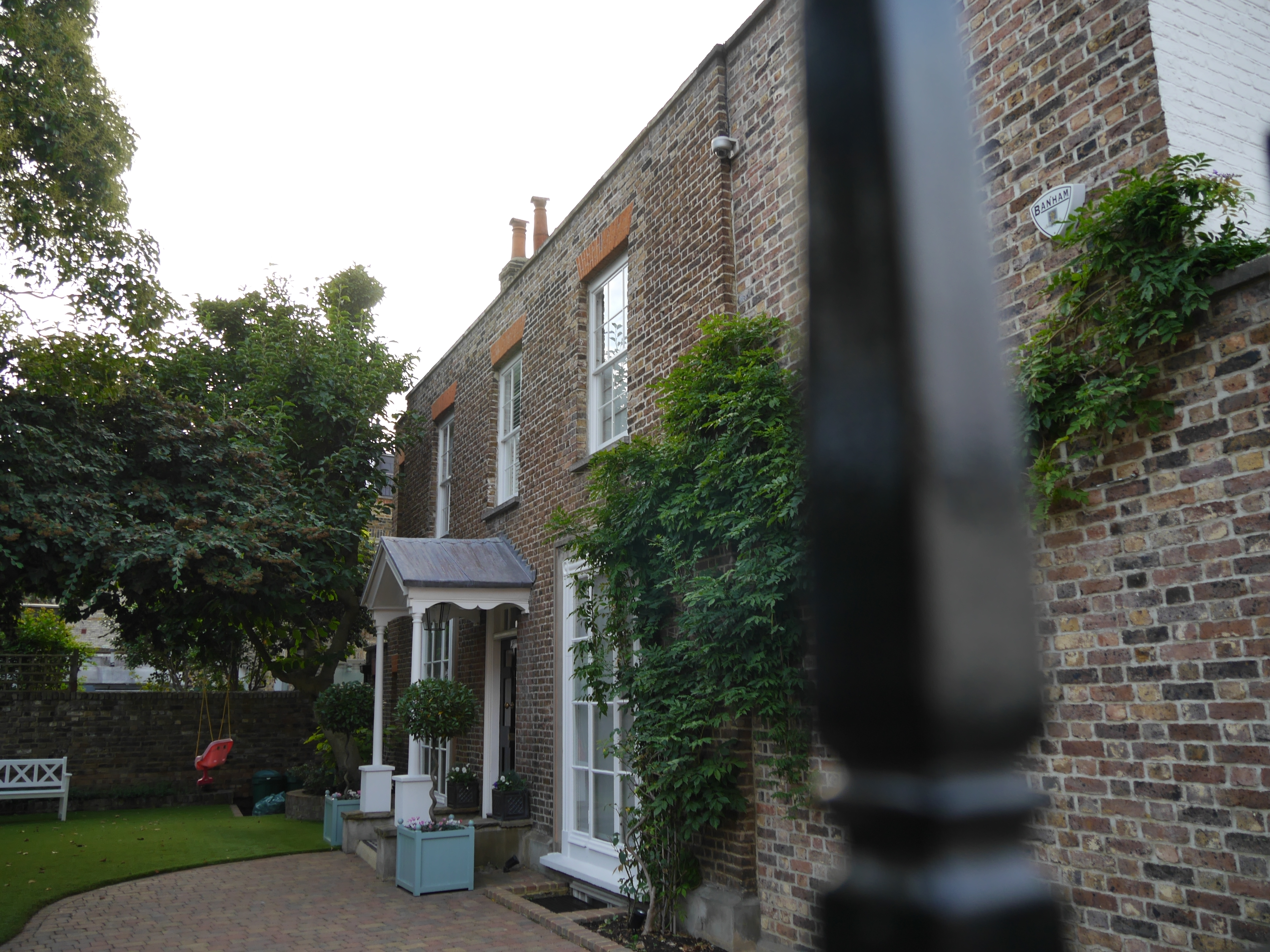
Vine and Bell Cottage, 2016

Vine and Bell Cottage, also known as Vine Cottages, is a Grade II listed building at 622 Fulham Road, Fulham, London, built in the early 18th century.
