= New Cross Fire Station =

Grade II listed building in London, England

Coordinates: 51°28′25.3″N 0°2′57.6″W

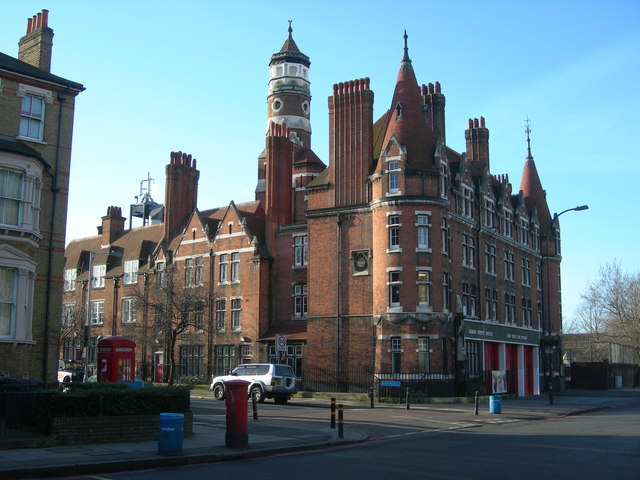
New Cross Fire Station

New Cross Fire Station is a Grade II listed building at 266 Queens Road, New Cross, London.

It was built in 1893–94 and the architect was Robert Pearsall.

George Arthur Roberts, founder and pioneer of the discussion and education groups of the fire service, was stationed here during World War II.
