= The Venue (New Cross, London) =

Former cinema and music venue in London, England

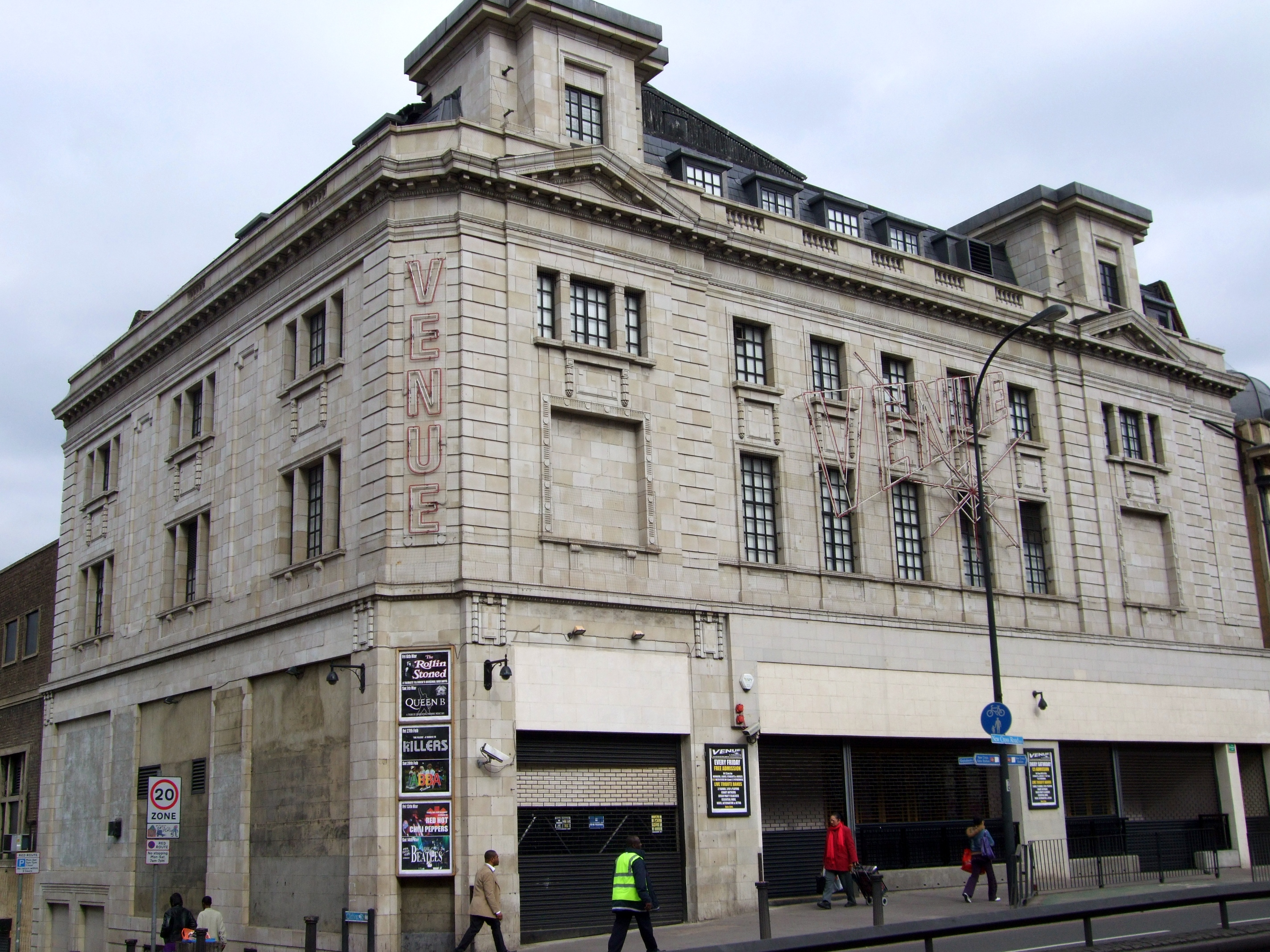
- Interactive map of The Venue
- Location: 2 Clifton Rise / 325 to 327 New Cross Road; New Cross, London, SE14
- Capacity: 1400

Construction
- Opened: as New Cross Super Kinema (1925 - 1927); as New Cross Kinema (1927 - 1948); as Kinema (1948 - 1950); as Gaumont New Cross (1950 to 1960); as The Harp Club (1960s - 1989); as The Venue (1989)
- Closed: 2020

The Venue was a music venue and nightclub in a former cinema located in New Cross, London, England.

== History ==
The building first opened as a cinema named the New Cross Super Kinema in 1925. This was shortened to the New Cross Kinema in 1927, and further to just Kinema in 1948. During this time the building also housed the New Cross Palais de Danse. It became the Gaumont New Cross in 1950.

After this it was an Irish traditional music and Irish country dance hall named The Harp Club. In the 1970s the club hired out its rooms for reggae nights. By the late 1980s it had also become a venue for genres such as indie pop, goth, and acid house.

It opened as The Venue in April 1989. Artists to perform there included Oasis, Pulp, Suede, Blur, Lush, Radiohead, Chumbawamba, Teenage Fanclub, Mudhoney, Hole, Front Line Assembly, Current 93, The Melvins, Shed 7, The Cardiacs, and Subhumans.

Boxer Dominic Negus was a bouncer there for a time.

By the 2000s the majority of live concerts there were tribute acts, and it largely functioned more as a DJ-oriented nightclub.
