= 1–5 and 6 Sydney Place =

Terrace of houses in South Kensington, London, England

Coordinates: 51.4920°N 0.1721°W

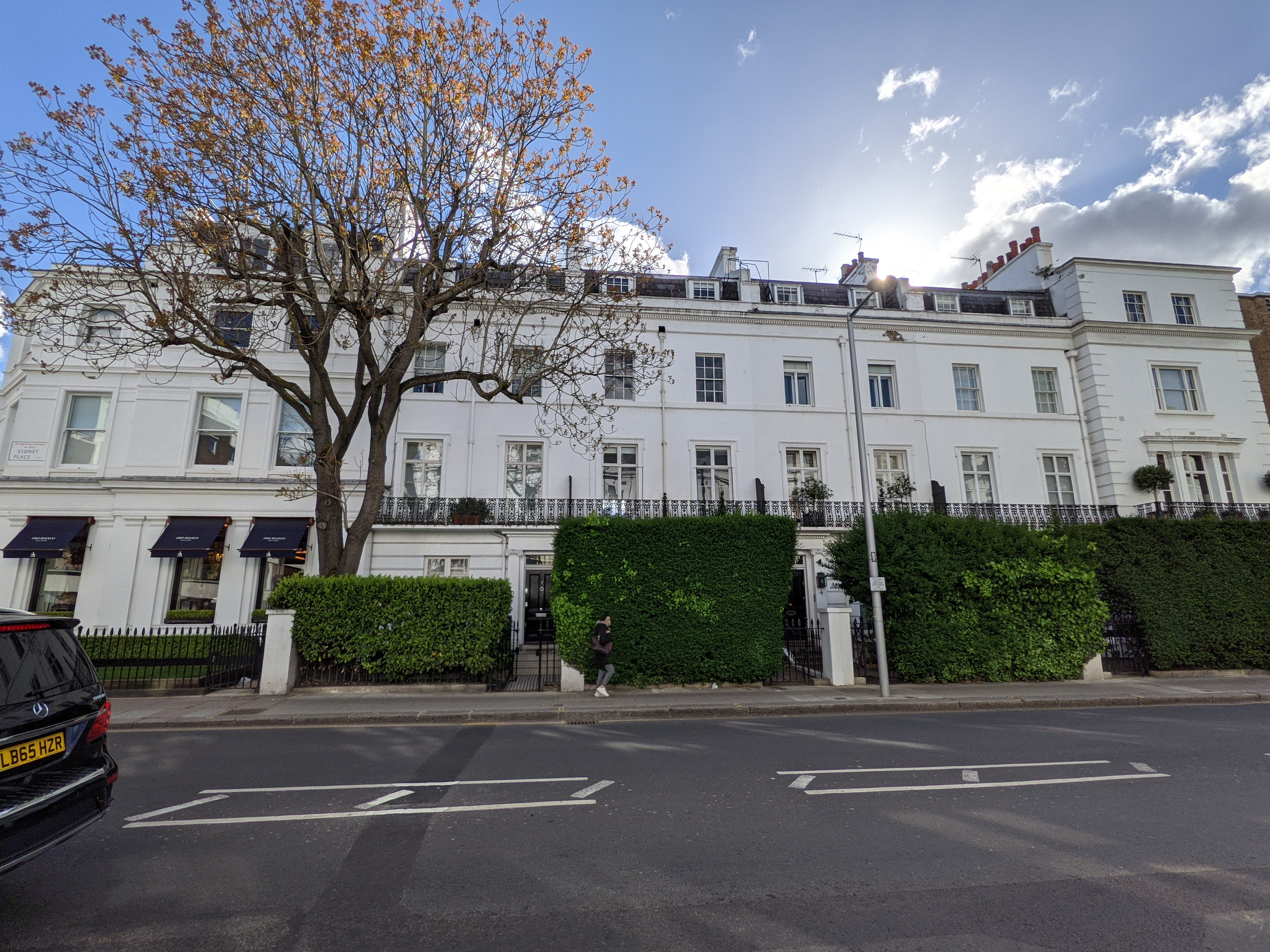
1–5 and 6 Sydney Place

1–5 and 6 Sydney Place, South Kensington, are a group of large terrace houses situated on the corner of Sydney Place and Fulham Road in London, United Kingdom. Sydney Place leads into Onslow Square. The buildings have been listed Grade II as a group on the National Heritage List for England since 1969.

The buildings span 5 floors and the freehold is owned by the Wellcome Trust. They stand four storeys high and cover over 5600 square feet.

Designed by George Basevi in the early nineteenth century, they were built by Charles James Freake between 1844 and 1845. At the end of the century, 1 Sydney Place changed from a residential to a commercial building. Until its acquisition by an interior designer company in 2017, the building had been home to a branch of HSBC bank.
