= Murder Squad (TV series) =

- Genre: Documentary
- Directed by: David Wilson, Paul Williams, Peter George
- Narrated by: Philip Tibenham
- Country of origin: United Kingdom
- Original language: English
- No. of seasons: 3
- No. of episodes: 12

Production
- Producer: Robert Fleming
- Editor: Bob Ede
- Running time: 30 minutes
- Production company: Thames/Argo

Original release
- Network: ITV
- Release: 4 February 1992 – 15 July 1997

Murder Squad is a documentary television series broadcast in 1992, 1996 and 1997 on the British ITV network. The series follows the Metropolitan Police's murder squad as they investigate homicides in London. The series includes the gathering of forensic evidence and police interviews with suspects.

== Episodes ==
There are three series of varying lengths, including a seven-part series broadcast in February and March 1992, a two-part special broadcast in 1996, and a three-part series broadcast in 1997. Each episode follows a particular murder investigation in a fly-on-the-wall format from crime to court room.

The episodes are:

Series 1

1. "The Murder of Douglas Piper", originally broadcast 4 February 1992;
2. "The Explosion at New Cross", originally broadcast 11 February 1992;
3. "The Murder of Noel Christopher Part 1", originally broadcast 18 February 1992;
4. "The Murder of Noel Christopher Part 2", originally broadcast 25 February 1992;
5. "The Missing Boy", originally broadcast 3 March 1992;
6. "The Murder of John Howard", originally broadcast 10 March 1992; and
7. "Life Sentence", originally broadcast 17 March 1992.

Series 2

1. "The Murder of an Unknown Man", originally broadcast 5 September 1996; and
2. "The Murder of Barry Stubbings", originally broadcast 12 September 1996.

Series 3

1. "The Killing of Mr and Mrs Ambasna", originally broadcast 1 July 1997;
2. "The Murder of Raymond Folks", originally broadcast 8 July 1997; and
3. "The Knife Killings", originally broadcast 15 July 1997.

The series includes investigations of real life crimes, following the murder squad during their investigations. The crimes include the murder of Madhavji Ambasna and his wife, Raliat, an elderly couple who were killed in April 1994 in Hounslow. Milton Wheeler, whose own father was a convicted murderer, was convicted of the crime at the Old Bailey in March 1995.

== Production team ==
The original series was produced and directed by London-born Robert Fleming; however, the 1996 and 1997 series were produced by John Withington, and directed by Paul Williams and Peter George. Robert Fleming was also known for producing the series Flying Squad, which followed the unit of the Metropolitan Police responsible for solving armed robberies.
