= Henry Stevens (police officer) =

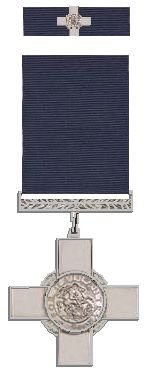
George Cross and its ribbon bar

Henry William Stevens GC (24 January 1928 – 17 November 2018) was awarded the George Cross for the gallantry he showed while serving as a constable in the Metropolitan Police on 29 March 1958.

Stevens was born in Upton Park, London. Prior to joining the Metropolitan Police Force, he served three years in the Royal Navy.

== The Bickley burglary ==
At around 8.00 pm, on 29 March 1958, a local criminal named Ronald Easterbrook, who was armed with a gun, was burgling a house in Bickley in the London Borough of Bromley. Police had been alerted to the burglary and dispatched PC Henry Stevens along with two other colleagues to investigate. Stevens went round to the rear of the property and spotted Easterbrook climbing over a wooden fence. Stevens identified himself as a police officer but when Easterbrook ran, Stevens gave chase along St. Georges Road, Bickley. As Stevens was gaining on Easterbrook, Easterbrook turned and pointed the gun at Stevens before saying "Stop, or you'll get this". Ignoring the warning, Stevens continued the chase and Easterbrook opened fire, shooting Stevens in the face.

The .22 calibre bullet ricocheted off Stevens' teeth before embedding itself in his tongue. Despite having been shot, Stevens managed to grab hold of Easterbrook and force him up against some iron railings at the side of a railway bridge. During the struggle, the constable managed to twist the gun from Easterbrook's hand, but Easterbrook managed to pull free. Stevens managed to grab the back of Easterbrook's overcoat. Easterbrook who was still running with the constable being dragged behind, suddenly slipped off his overcoat and jacket causing Stevens to fall to the ground. Easterbrook then escaped over the railway bridge.

The coat and jacket were later used to help identify Easterbrook. The officer, PC Henry Stevens was also able to identify Easterbrook from photographs shown to him whilst he was in hospital.

The case was heard at the Old Bailey and on 13 May 1958. Ronald Easterbrook was initially charged with attempted murder but was acquitted due to lack of evidence that he actually intended to kill PC Stevens. Easterbrook was instead convicted of the lesser charge of grievous bodily harm and intent to resist his lawful apprehension. He was sentenced to 10 years.

In summing up, judge Mr. Justice Ashworth said of Ronald Easterbrook "You are in my view a wicked and dangerous man".

== Citation for the George Cross ==
Henry Stevens received his citation for the George Cross in October 1958. His citation was published in the London Gazette on 21 October 1958. The George Cross is Britain's highest award for bravery. Stevens later attended Buckingham Palace to collect his award with his wife Andree and his two children, Paul and Lorraine.

in 1998, Stevens met with Metropolitan Police Commissioner, Sir Ian Blair, at an event to honour winners of the George Cross who had served in the Metropolitan Police Service.

In 2001, Stevens attended an event held at Westminster Abbey to honour those had won the Victoria Cross or the George Cross.

== Later service ==
Stevens recovered from his injuries and continued to serve in the Metropolitan Police until his retirement in 1983 with the rank of detective chief inspector.

== Honours and awards ==
George Cross (GC)	1958
Queen Elizabeth II Silver Jubilee Medal	1977
Queen Elizabeth II Golden Jubilee Medal	2002
Queen Elizabeth II Diamond Jubilee Medal	2012
Police Long Service and Good Conduct Medal	
