= Fulham Fire Station =

Grade II listed building in London, England

Coordinates: 51.4779°N 0.2010°W

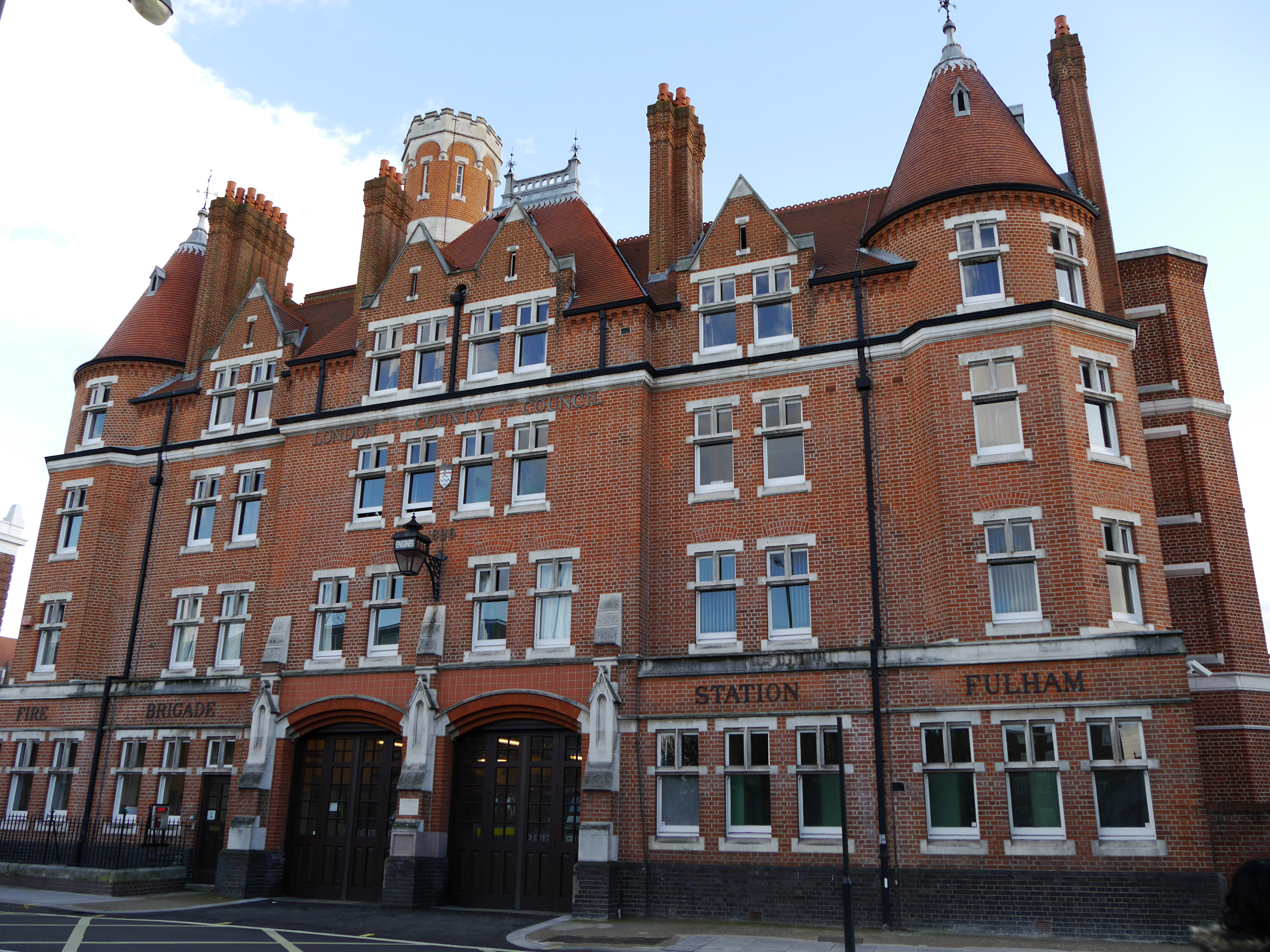
Fulham Fire Station, 2014

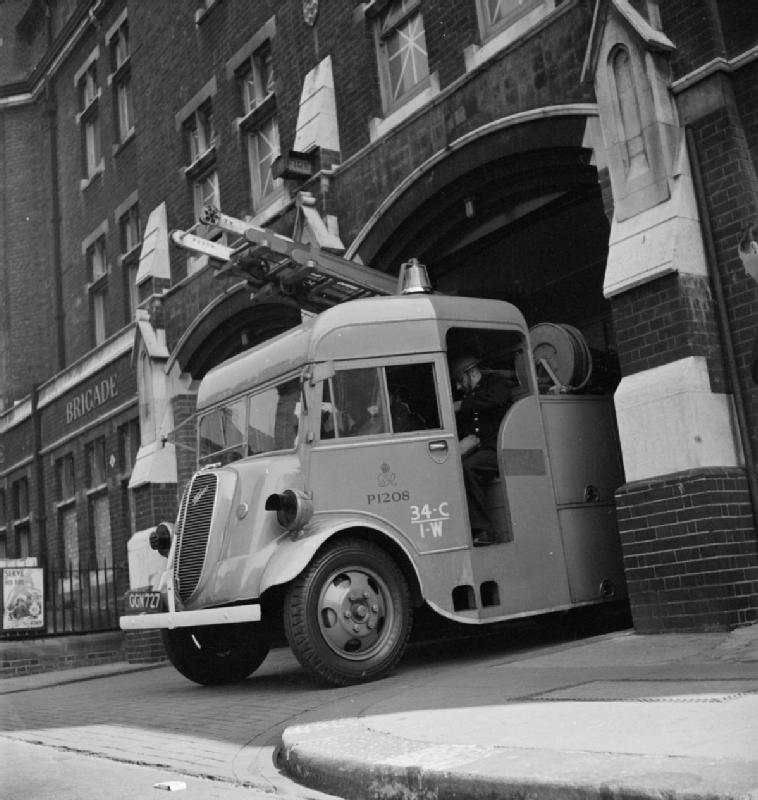
Fulham Fire Station, 1942

Fulham Fire Station is a Grade II listed building at 685 Fulham Road, Fulham, London.

It was built from 1895 to 1896, and the chief architect was Robert Pearsall. In 1994, it was refurbished and extended by the Welling Partnership.

== History ==
In 1865, when Fulham Fire Station opened, it was staffed by 12 married men, six single men, one officer, and one coachman. The station housed a steam fire engine, a manual engine, a hose tender, and a horse cart. Four horses were stabled there. In 1913, the station was adapted for motor use.
