= Fulham Road =

Street in London, England

- A308 A304

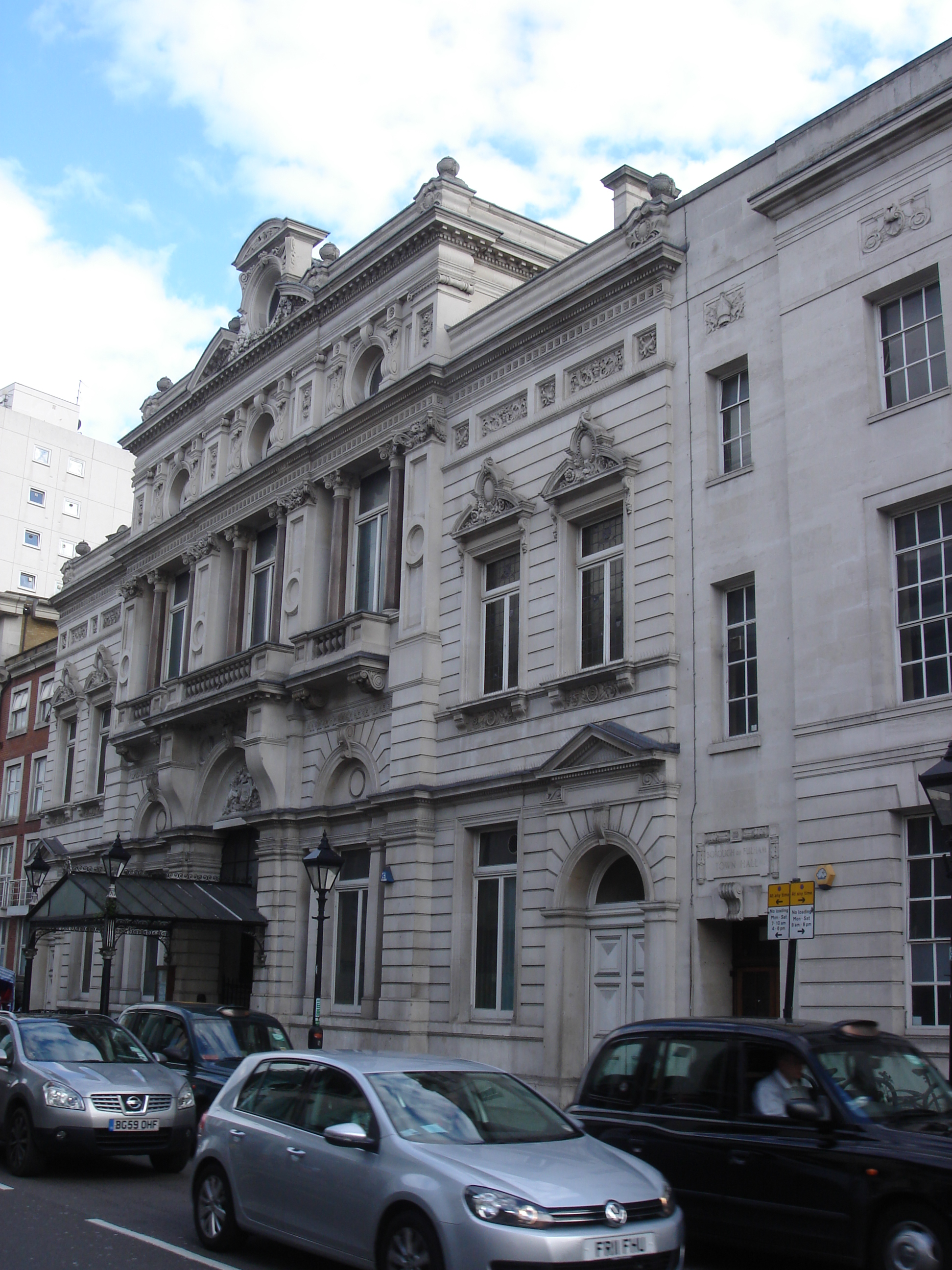
- Fulham Town Hall
- Interactive map of Fulham Road
- Length: 2.5 mi (4.0 km)
- Postal code: SW3, SW6, SW10
- Northeast end: 51.4935°N 0.1690°W
- Southwest end: 51.4716°N 0.2111°W

Fulham Road is a street in London, England, which comprises the A304 and part of the A308.

== Overview ==
Fulham Road ( the A219) runs from Putney Bridge as "Fulham High Street" and then eastward to Fulham Broadway, in the London Borough of Hammersmith and Fulham, through Chelsea to Brompton Road Knightsbridge which continues to the A4 in Brompton, in the Royal Borough of Kensington and Chelsea. It is designated the A304 as far as its junction with the A308 road at Gunter Grove, where the A308 then forms the eastern section of the street.

Fulham Road is roughly parallel to King's Road, from Fulham Palace. There are numerous antique dealers and specialist interior furnishing shops, while designer couture outlets have begun to arrive at the eastern end. The section nearest the cinema is known as The Beach, and is home to various trendy bars, pubs and clubs. The nearest underground stations are: South Kensington and Gloucester Road.

Fulham Road is known for the following landmarks:

- Stamford Bridge football ground, home of Chelsea F.C.
- The first Habitat store, opened by Terence Conran on 11 May 1964
- Cineworld Cinema
- Fulham Broadway Underground station
- Fulham Town Hall
- Chelsea and Westminster Hospital
- Royal Brompton Hospital
- Royal Marsden Hospital
- Michelin House
- 1–5 and 6 Sydney Place

At the Fulham end of the street:

- Fulham Fire Station
- Fulham Palace
- Putney Bridge

It is the home of Chelsea's stadium, Stamford Bridge, which has an official capacity of 41,837. Many Chelsea supporters travel to home games using Fulham Broadway Underground Station.

== History ==
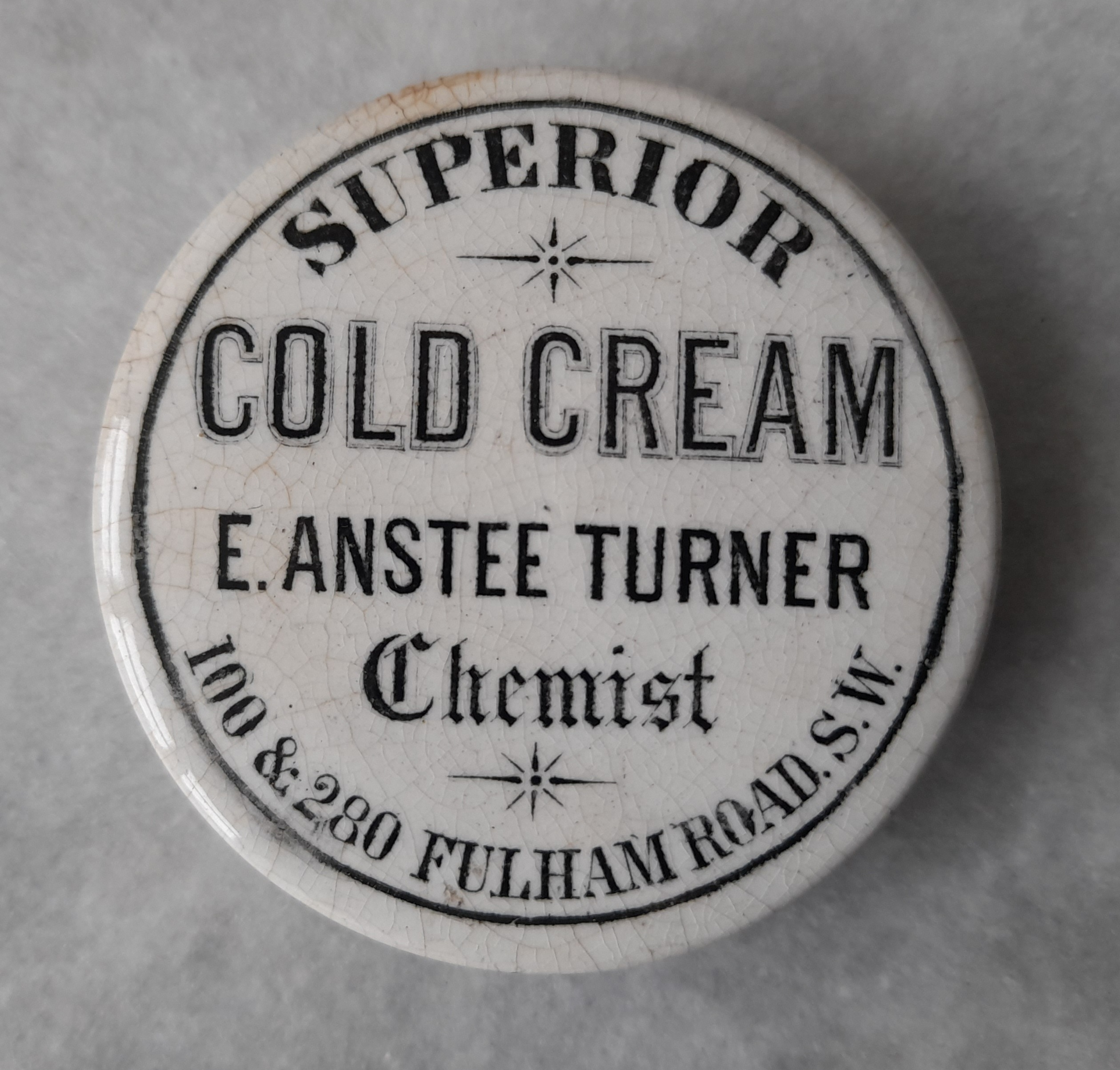
Anstee Turner C19th printed pottery Cold Cream pot lid, excavated, 6.2 x 1.5 cm

Around 1890 chemist E. Anstee Turner owned shops at 100 & 280 Fulham Road producing 'superior' Cold Cream sold in pottery pots with black & white transfer printed lids that are occasionally found in excavated C19th rubbish dumps.

== Cultural references ==
Fulham Road is cited extensively on the Jethro Tull album A Passion Play, and in the Morrissey song "Maladjusted".

== See also ==
- Sloane Ranger
- Vine and Bell Cottage
