= Robert Pearsall (architect) =

English architect

- Born: 3 March 1852; Peckham Rye, Surrey, England
- Died: 1929 (aged 76–77)
- Occupation: Architect
- Spouse: Libbie Florence Dezill
- Children: 3
- Buildings: London fire stations

Robert Pearsall (3 March 1852 – 1929) was an English architect. He was architect to the London Fire Brigade, for whom he designed several notable fire stations, seven of which are Grade II listed buildings. His work included Woolwich Fire Station, built in 1887, and extensions to Clerkenwell's 1872 station, which was London's oldest operational fire station before both stations were among ten closed on 9 January 2014.

== Early life ==
He was born on 3 March 1852 at Oregon Terrace, Peckham Rye, Surrey (now London), the son of Henry Robert Pearsall, and initially educated at the Islington Proprietary School. He was then articled to Sir Arthur Blomfield, and after studying at the Royal Academy (1871–1873), began to practice in his own account.

== Career ==
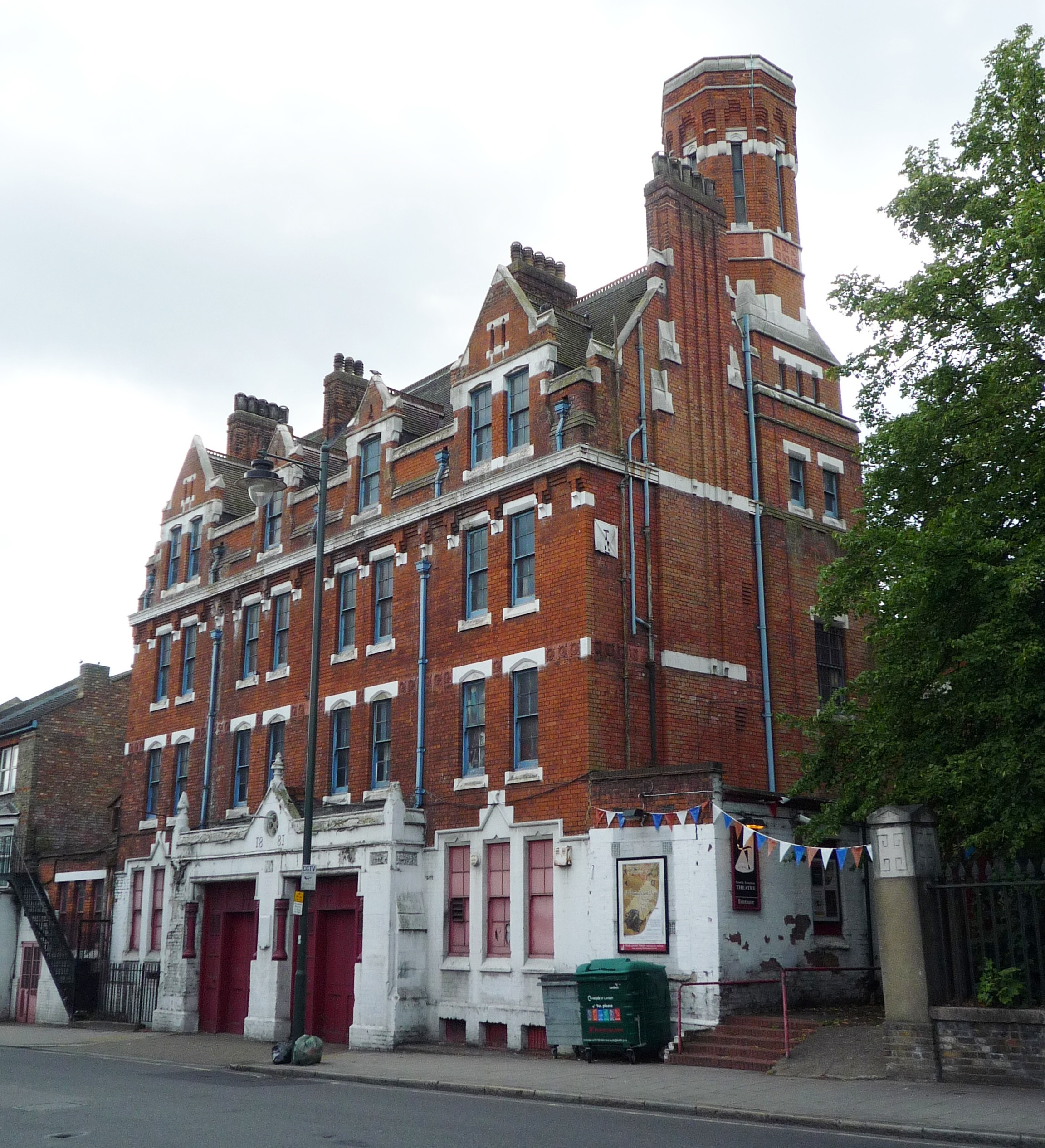
West Norwood Fire Station, now the South London Theatre

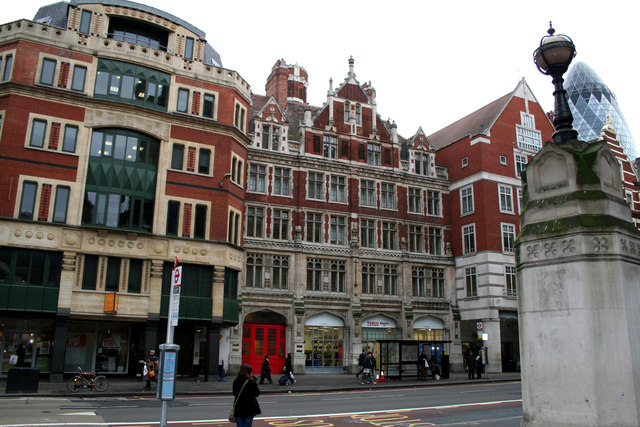
Old Fire station, Bishopsgate, now a supermarket

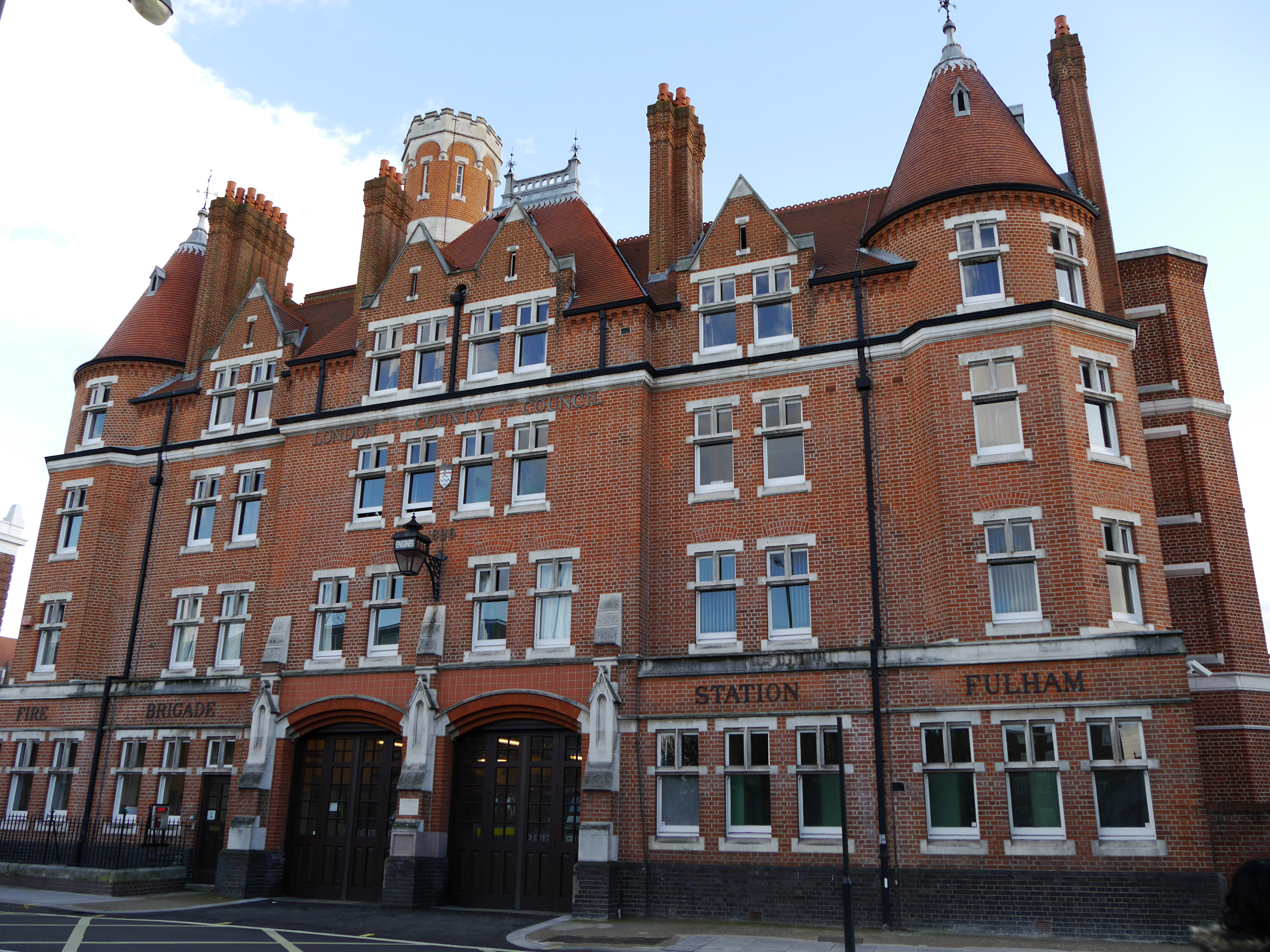
Fulham Fire Station, 2014

He was appointed architect in the Fire Brigade Office, Metropolitan Board of Works (MBW, later London County Council) in 1879, and was initially supervised by Alfred Mott. After 1889, Pearsall headed the new Fire Brigade Section of the London County Council. His notable buildings include several fire stations now Grade II listed including:

- Tooley Street (1878–79; now Brigade Bar and Bistro)
- West Norwood Fire Station (1881; now the South London Theatre)
- 164 Bishopsgate (1885; now a supermarket)
- Woolwich Fire Station (1887)
- Manchester Square Fire Station (1889; now a hotel)
- New Cross Fire Station (1893–94)
- Fulham Fire Station (1895–96), at 685 Fulham Road, Fulham

Pearsall also designed London fire stations in Stoke Newington (now The Old Fire Station, a community building) and Rosebery Avenue in Clerkenwell (Pearsall designed its extension in 1895–97; the original building was some 25 years older, making it London's oldest operational station when it closed on 9 January 2014).

Pearsall also designed now-demolished London fire stations in Holborn, Kentish Town, Shadwell, North Kensington, and Camden Town.

In 1873, Pearsall designed three different railway sleeping cars for the American William d'Alton Mann. The first of the cars manufactured was used to convey the newly wed Alfred, Duke of Saxe-Coburg and Gotha and his bride from St Petersburg to Flushing.

Pearsall designed the chancel and transepts added to Plaxtol Church in Kent in 1894.

Pearsall was also a life member of the British Museum, and served on "The Committee for the Survey of the Memorials of Greater London".

== Personal life ==
On 2 April 1878, he married Libbie Florence Dezill (1859–1899), the daughter of Charles Antoine Ferdinand Dezille who was born in 1829, in Calais, France. and Isabel Bruce Craib who was born on March 22, 1831, in Hampton Wick, London.and settled in Islington London. They had three children together: Estelle Maud Pearsall, Robert Humphrey Pearsall, and Gerald Clifford Swinnerton Pearsall.
