= Woolwich Fire Station =

Grade II listed building in London, England

Coordinates: 51.4919°N 0.0575°E

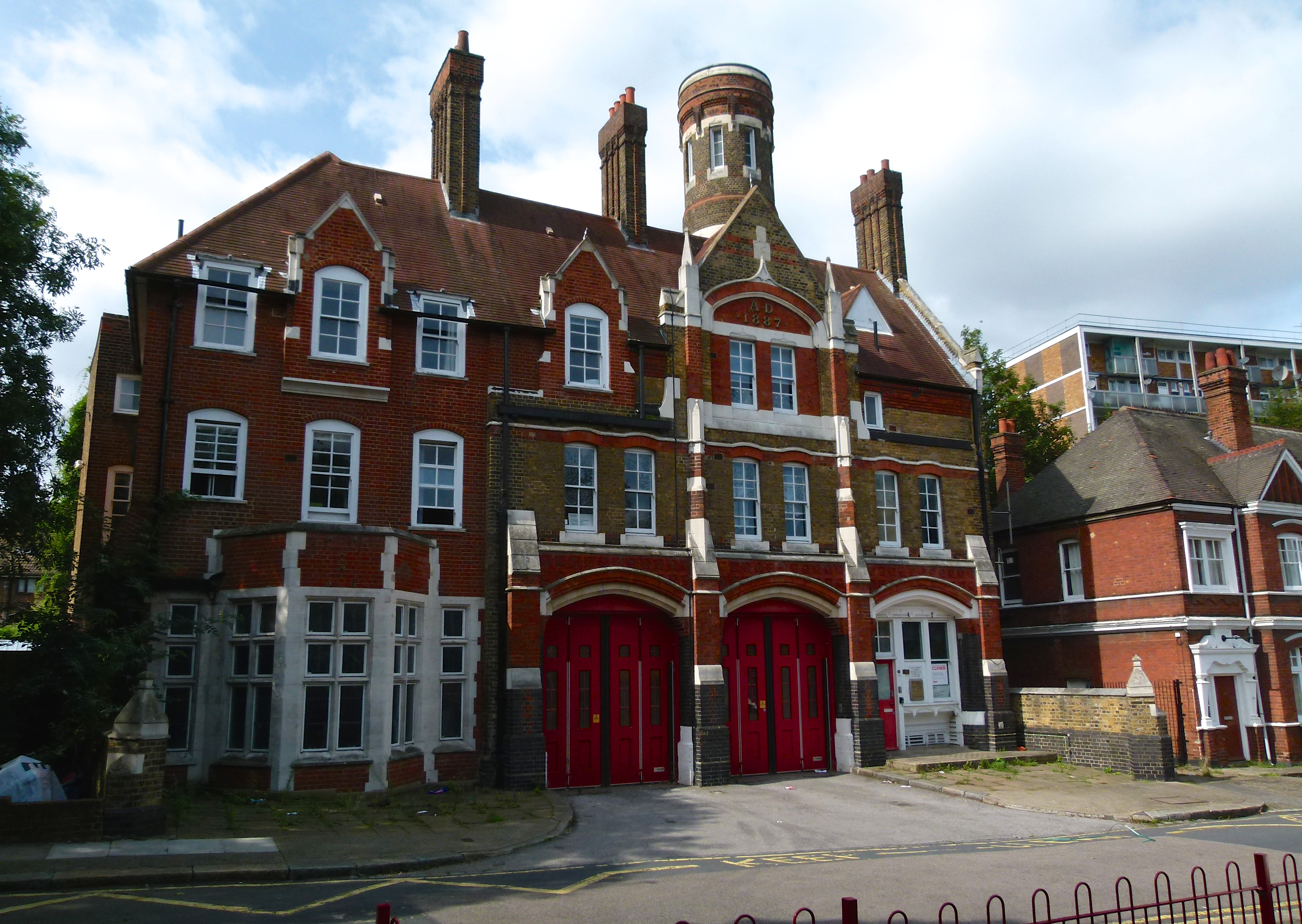
Woolwich Fire Station

Woolwich Fire Station is a Grade II listed building at 24 Sunbury, Woolwich, London.

It was built in 1887, and the architect was Robert Pearsall. It was London's second-oldest operational fire station, with crews at one time using its five-storey octagonal watchtower to spot fires in the surrounding area.

The fire station closed in January 2014 under mayor Boris Johnson's Fifth London Safety Plan. In 2016 it was given planning permission to be converted into flats.
