= George Arthur Roberts =

Trinidadian soldier, firefighter, and community leader

George Arthur Roberts BEM MSM
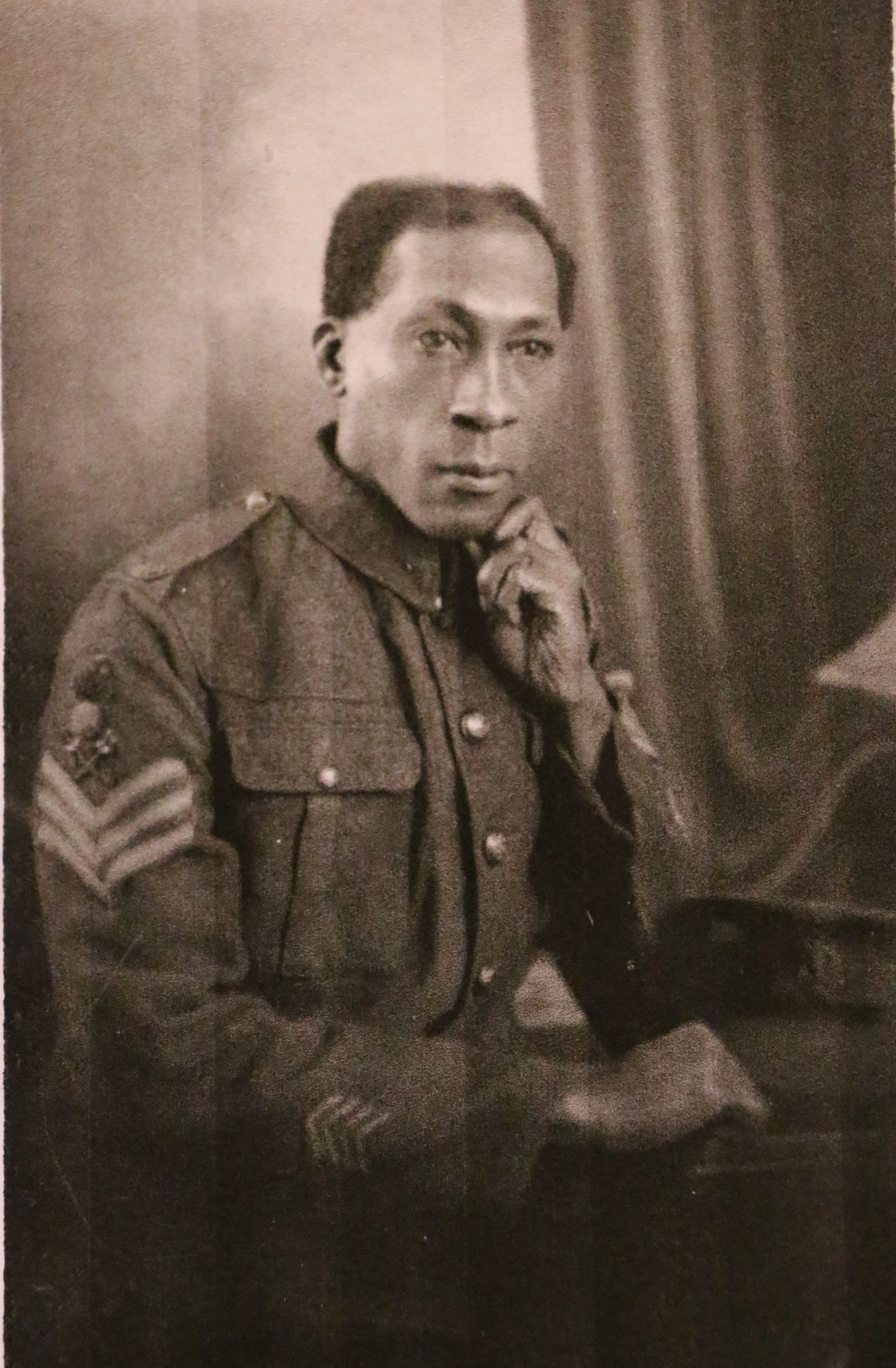
- Born: 1 August 1891; Trinidad and Tobago
- Died: 8 January 1970 (aged 78); London, England
- Occupations: First World War soldier, Second World War fireman, West Indian Community Leader

George Arthur Roberts BEM MSM (1 August 1891 – 8 January 1970) was a Trinidadian soldier, firefighter, and community leader in Great Britain.

He served in the First World War, where he became known as the "Coconut bomber" and went on to become a firefighter during the Blitz and rest of the Second World War. In 1944 he was awarded the British Empire Medal "for general duties at New Cross Fire Station" and for his part as a founder and pioneer of the discussion and education groups of the fire service. Plaques have been erected in his honour in London, at his home and his workplace.

== First World War ==
When the war began, Roberts enlisted in the Trinidad Army and then signed up to the European Service and worked his way from Trinidad to England, where he was placed in the Middlesex Regiment. As a rifleman attached to the Middlesex Regiment, he fought in the battles of Loos and the Somme. He was wounded first at the Battle of Loos, and then in the Battle of the Somme.

According to the wartime magazine Every Week , he distinguished himself by his "extraordinary" ability to throw bombs back into enemy lines, as he did with coconuts as a child, and became known as the "Coconut Bomber".

The magazine also reported that he was given special leave to return to Trinidad to recruit more volunteers and was able to sign up more than 250 men with his "vigorous speeches".

Standing at 6’2", Roberts earned a reputation in the Great War for throwing bombs back over enemy lines.

After the war Roberts settled in London, first living in Peckham and then Camberwell, where he and his family lived for almost 50 years.

== League of Coloured Peoples ==
Roberts earned a living as an electrician, a trade he had learnt in Trinidad, but found himself up against the bigotry that he and other black people were subjected to in their day-to-day lives, war heroes or not.

In response, in 1931, he joined as one of the founder members of the League of Coloured Peoples, the era's most influential civil rights organisation and one of the first organisations to take care of the needs of Britain's black community, and according to its 1944 minutes was a member of its executive committee "almost from the inception".

== World War II fireman ==
When the Second World War broke out, he was too old for combat. Instead he enlisted for the Home Front, saving countless lives in Southwark as a firefighter during the Blitz, having completed his training with the fire service in 1939.

In 1943, Roberts was made a section leader and in the King's 1944 Birthday Honours he was awarded the British Empire Medal "for general duties at New Cross Fire Station" and for his part as a founder and pioneer of the Discussion and Education groups of the fire service throughout the Second World War.

Thousands of men and women would turn up to such groups at their local station houses every week in this government-inspired effort at consciousness-raising.

"If what I am doing can assist in some small way to bring about a better understanding and a true fellowship amongst the peoples of the earth, I shall be extremely happy," Roberts told the BBC radio programme Calling the West Indies on 4 May 1947.

== Awards ==
On 8th June 1944, King George VI awarded the British Empire Medal (Civil Division) to "George Arthur Roberts, Leading Fireman No 47 London Area, National Fire Service". This was announced in the London Gazette, page 2860 of the supplement 36547.

Roberts was also awarded the Meritorious Service Medal (United Kingdom).

He was also issued with a Queen Elizabeth II Coronation Medal to be worn in commemoration of Her Majesty's Coronation, 2 June 1953.

== British Legion ==
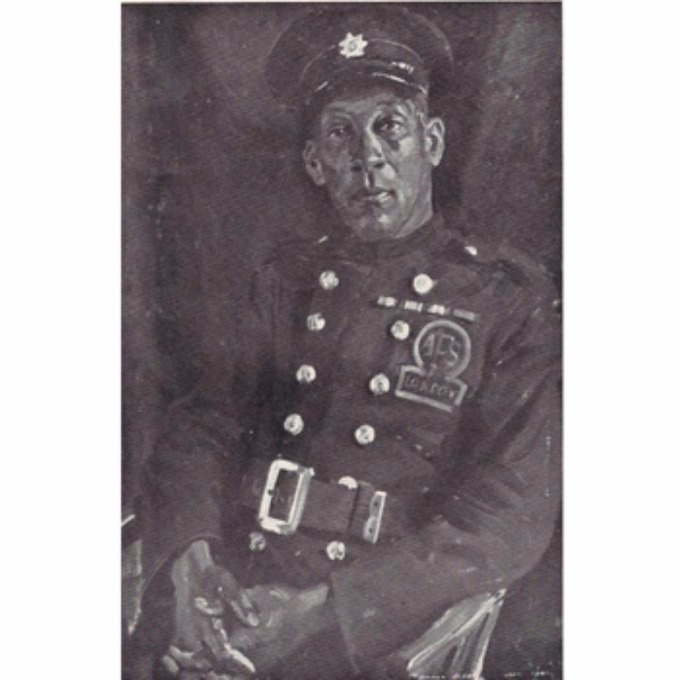
Portrait of George Arthur Roberts by Norman Hepple c.1931

Roberts was passionate about the plight of his fellow ex-servicemen and campaigned over the years on behalf of The National Federation of Discharged and Demobilised Sailors and Soldiers, going on to found the local branch of the British Legion. He led thousands of ex-servicemen, including those with battle-wounded who were unable to walk, in a march demanding improved rights and higher pensions.

Roberts was so well known at the time that he was even painted by the portrait artist, Norman Hepple.

After his death in 1970, he became a forgotten figure until interest in the pre-Windrush generation of black migrants began to surface around 2018 and he is featured in Stephen Bourne’s 2019 revised version of his acclaimed book Black Poppies – Britain's Black Community & the Great War, the story of men of the "old British Empire" who regarded joining the war effort as a matter of honour.

== Marriage and children ==
In Trinidad, Roberts had two daughters, Violet and Stella, with Delcina Green. After the First World War, he settled at 84 Meeting House Lane in Peckham. In 1920, he married Margaret Whyland; they had two sons, Cyril and Victor. They lived in Camberwell at 40 Bournemouth Road before settling in the Lewis Trust Dwellings in Warner Road, Camberwell, which remained his home until he died in January 1970 at King's College Hospital, London. A fortnight later, on 20 January, Roberts was cremated at Honor Oak Crematorium and his ashes scattered on the New Circular Lawn. Margaret Roberts died in 1937 and Roberts married Rose Barnett in 1941.

== Plaques and Stamps ==
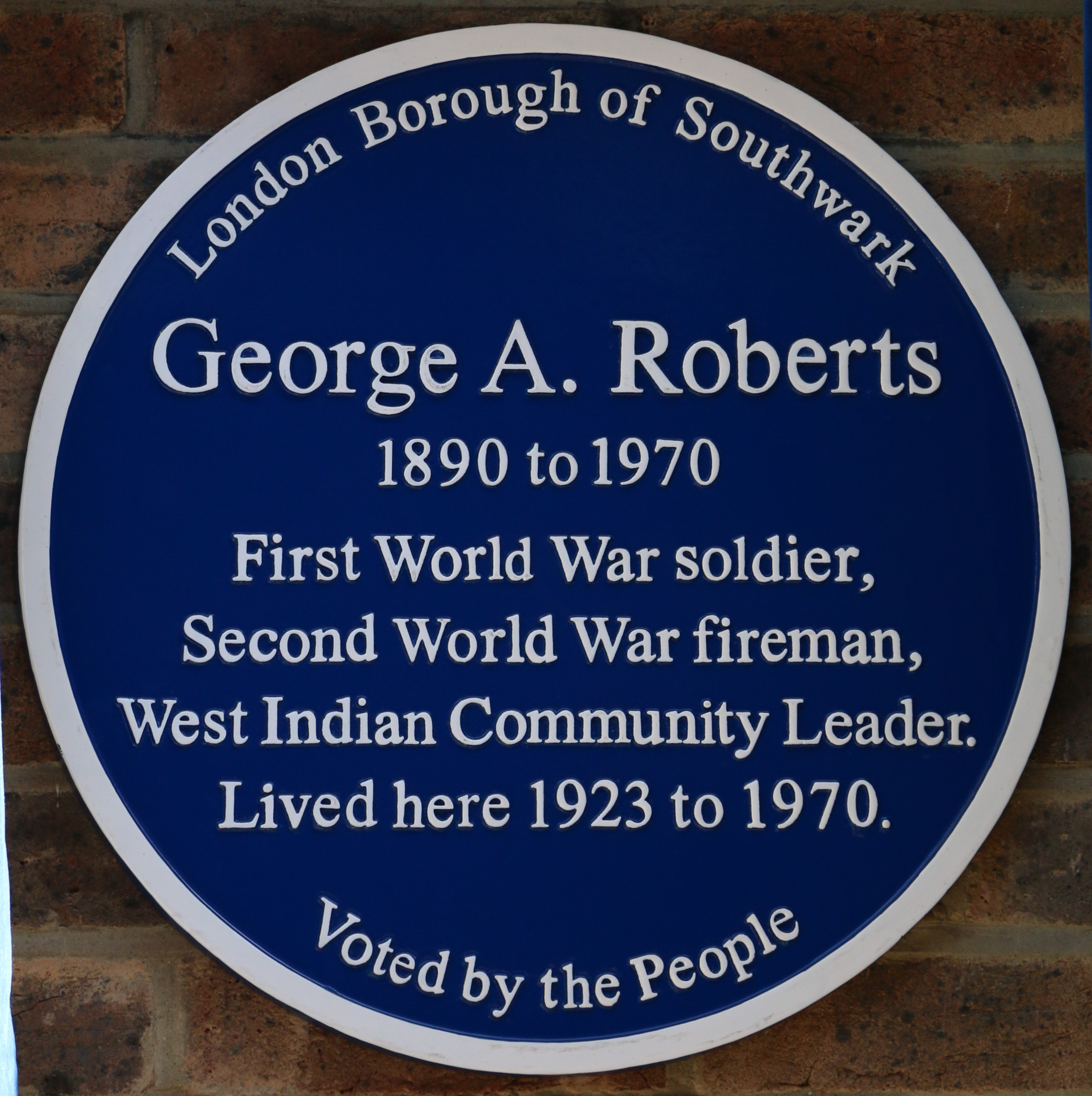
Blue Plaque for George Arthur Roberts

In September 2016, Roberts was honoured with a blue plaque by the London Borough of Southwark as one of the first black men to serve in the army and fire brigade.

The plaque is located on the Lewis Trust Dwellings in Warner Road, Camberwell, London. The scheme was led by the Southwark Heritage Association.

At the unveiling firefighters solemnly formed a guard of honour at the ceremony. The ceremony was attended by family, politicians including Harriet Harman and the Mayor of Southwark, and assorted dignitaries, including the Acting High Commissioner of Trinidad and Tobago.

Southwark historian Stephen Bourne had researched his life and career. Bourne then nominated Roberts for the blue plaque. When his nomination was accepted, Bourne led a campaign for Roberts to win. Roberts not only won, but proved to be a popular choice with voters. In 2020, Bourne included Roberts and his service in the Second World War in his book Under Fire – Black Britain in Wartime 1939-45 (The History Press).

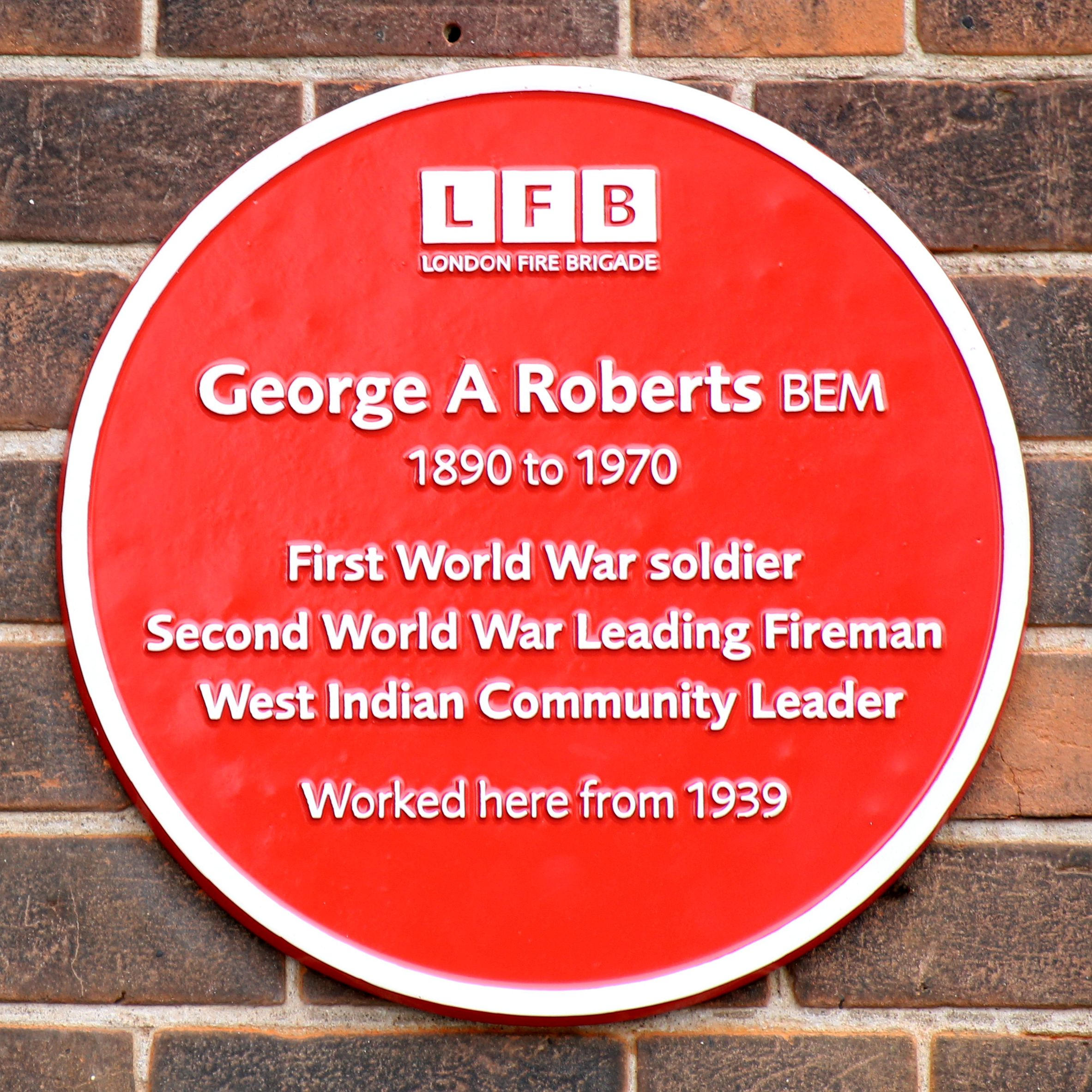
Red Plaque on New Cross Fire Station

On 15 April 2018 a red plaque was unveiled by London Fire Brigade on New Cross Fire Station in South East London where he was stationed in World War Two.

On 1 May 2025, a commemorative first class stamp was issued by the Royal Mail honouring George's firefighting efforts during the Blitz as part of the "Valour and Victory: Stories of the Second World War" series.
