= The Indelicates =

English indie rock band

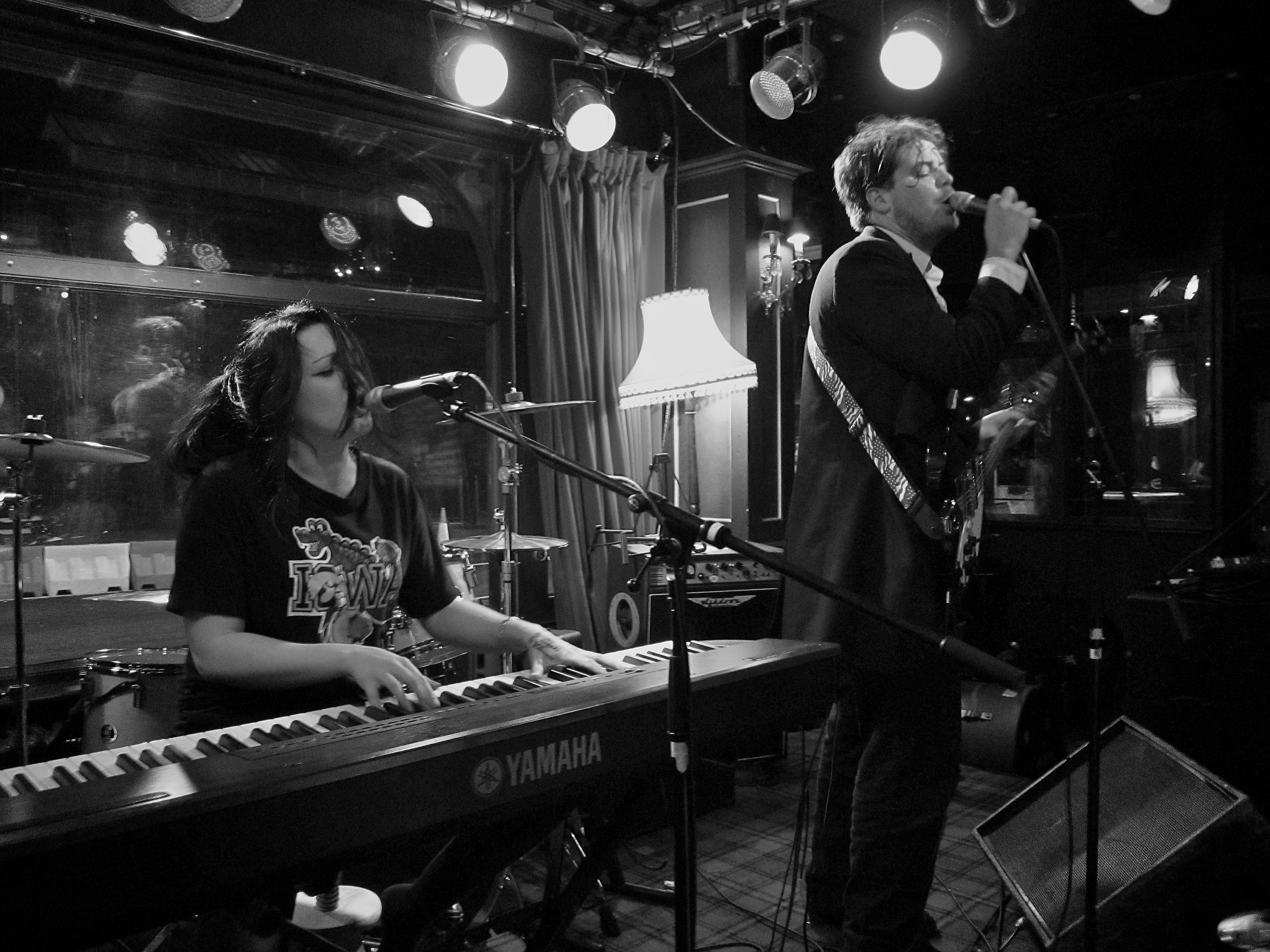
- Julia Indelicate (left) and Simon Indelicate (right)

Background information
- Origin: Brighton, England
- Genres: Indie rock, indie pop
- Years active: 2005–present
- Labels: Sad Gnome Records; Weekender Records; Corporate Records
- Members: Julia Indelicate (vocals, piano); Simon Indelicate (vocals, guitar); Alastair Clayton (rhythm); Nick Kos (bass); Benny Lewis (drums); Heather Newton (violin)
- Past members: Ed van Beinum (drums); Laurence Owen (bass); Kate Newberry (bass); Jack James Stone (drums); Max Saidi (drums); Lily Rae (vocals, guitar); Louisa Wood (violin)
- Website: www.indelicates.com

The Indelicates are a Sussex-based English indie rock band. Formed in 2005 by Julia and Simon Indelicate, the band's songs are known for their mix of dark, cynical lyrics and tuneful rock melodies. The Indelicates came to attention with their early demos, which were released for free on their website. The band signed to independent record label Sad Gnome Records in 2006 and released several singles and an EP. After leaving Sad Gnome in 2007, the band signed to another independent label, Weekender Records, which issued their first album, American Demo, in 2008.

After Weekender found itself in financial difficulty, the Indelicates asked to be released from their contract. In 2010, the band formed Corporate Records, through which artists could sell their own work on a pay-what-you-like basis and retain the bulk of the profits. The band's first release through the label was Songs for Swinging Lovers in 2010. Four more albums followed, including the concept album David Koresh Superstar in 2011, based on the life of Branch Davidian religious sect leader David Koresh. Their most recent album was released in 2025, Avenue Qanon. The Indelicates are also known for their innovative and progressive marketing techniques, including crowdfunding their fourth album before Kickstarter had a UK presence, "Super Special Editions", and virtual reality and 360-degree music videos.

The band remain favourites in the blogosphere, but although they received positive notices in the mainstream music press and achieved some popularity in Germany, they have never had a breakout hit. While Simon and Julia have been ever-present, the Indelicates have featured several line-ups since their formation, sometimes with a rotating roster of backing musicians for live shows, which they continue to perform in the UK and Europe.

== Early work ==
=== Formation ===
The Indelicates were formed in 2005 in Brighton, UK, by Julia and Simon Indelicate, (Note: Sometimes credited as Julia Clark-Lowes and Simon Clayton.) who had met five years previously at a poetry slam. The pair created several independent and joint artistic projects, which they promoted through their individual MySpace pages. Julia was also a documentary photographer and Simon had been a performance poet on the cabaret circuit. Simon also wrote a musical based on the Book of Job. In 2003, Julia co-founded indie pop band The Pipettes, but left in early 2005 to form the Indelicates with Simon.

The band began playing venues in September 2005, with a line-up that initially consisted of Julia on vocals and piano, Simon on vocals and guitar, Jack Stone on drums, Kate Newberry on bass guitar, and Alastair Clayton on rhythm guitar. Ed Van Beinum later took over from Stone.

=== Demos and recognition ===
"Neo-Brecht/Weill theatricality? Check. Profane razor strop wit? Check. Irreverent misanthropy? Check. Scathing socio-cultural critiques? Check. Acid sweet indiepop songcraft? Check. Meet the first Great band of 2006, the fabulously unfashionable, unfashionably fabulous Indelicates."

— Michael Krugman and Jason Cohen in Rolling Stone, December 2005.

In late 2005, the band released several songs as free downloads on its own website, including "Waiting for Pete Doherty to Die". The song helped the Indelicates build a fanbase, but was also a source of "controversy and misunderstanding". Dan Hancox in New Statesman described it as "attention-seekingly controversial", and Julia stated that the band received a lot of letters and e-mails attacking the band over the song. She described these as coming from people who had only seen the title.

Simon said of the reaction, "I have never met [Pete Doherty], nor have I ever written a song about him (though I may have written a song about people who subsequently thought I had)." Simon also said that some fans of Babyshambles (Pete Doherty's band at the time) attended the Indelicates' concerts to find out how hateful they were, only to learn that the intent of the song was not about wishing Doherty would die, but about the "hypocritical" media machine that profits from the deaths of musicians: "circling vultures waiting for the end". In its 2005 yearbook, NME chose the song as its "most controversial pick of the year".

Hancox went on to praise "Waiting for Pete Doherty to Die" as "a bitter-sweet, folk-tinged bit of acoustic soul searching typical of this fascinating new band." Jetzt magazine said that the song captured the impression one would get from reading the English press that Doherty was on a death spiral and that with the song "media criticism, cynicism, nihilism and beautiful music come together perfectly". Author Neil Gaiman said of the song, "I was hooked in one, as they took apart, with bitter grace, the media/academic obsession with and delight in the downfall of stars and idols."

The Indelicates also made available "Burn All the Photographs", "Vladimir" "Julia, We Don't Live in the 60s" and "New Art for the People". NME described "New Art for the People" as "stunning", and Exclaim! said that the song's "unmistakably twee ... delivery" made it "beguiling" and "distinctive".

=== Sad Gnome ===
Q: "Where did the name 'The Indelicates' come from?"
Simon: "I like the word because it sounds like exactly what it isn’t. Like most privatives, it contains the thing it describes an absence of – thus indicating its presence as a defining concept, even while signifying its opposite. Plus, it sounds kinda cool."
Julia: "From Simon"

— 2006 interview.

The Indelicates' website also featured an early recording of "We Hate the Kids". In 2006, the Indelicates signed to independent record label Sad Gnome Records and on 24 July released "We Hate the Kids" through the label as a two-track 7" vinyl single (with "Burn all the Photographs" as a B-side) and four-track digital download (with additional remixes). The song was a re-recording of the original demo, which had been recorded in Alastair's bedroom and was removed from the band's site ahead of the release. The new version was produced by Keith Mahony (Note: Also known by his stage name, Keith Top of the Pops.) and co-produced and mastered by Les Carter. (Note: Also known by his stage name, Fruitbat, as part of the band Carter USM.) It was Sad Gnome Records' first release.

Hancox had called the first version of the song the Indelicates' "most exciting ... a cynical, disaffected, lo-fi anthem", and "We Hate the Kids" received positive reviews in NME and Rolling Stone. In 2012, "We Hate The Kids" was used on the soundtrack of German film Drei Zimmer/Küche/Bad (English title: Move), and in September 2020, God Is in the TV listed it at No. 67 in its list of 100 songs deserving to be rescued from the indie rock "landfill" era.

The band's last release while signed to Sad Gnome was the EP "The Last Significant Statement To Be Made in Rock'n'Roll", on 12 February 2007. The six-track CD consisted of the title track, plus "Sixteen", "Heroin", acoustic track "Unity Mitford", live track "Stars" and a remix of the title track. The EP was released to tie-in with the Indelicates' tour of Germany in the same month. Jetzt chose "Sixteen" as one of the most interesting song releases of the week, calling Julia's vocals irresistible and complimenting the song's brevity. The magazine also praised the EP as a whole, in particular the way in which Julia and Simon "complement each other, support each other, drive each other on ... they harmonize so perfectly".

== Weekender years ==
=== Touring and singles ===
Through 2007, the Indelicates had continued to play venues in the UK and Europe. In Germany they headlined several times and played support for Art Brut, whose lead singer, Eddie Argos, had previously called the Indelicates his favourite band. In April 2007, for British Music Week the German edition of Vanity Fair profiled "the most important" British bands that were playing German cities that year, calling the Indelicates' "We Hate The Kids" and "Waiting For Pete Doherty to Die" "so very brilliant".

By mid-year, the Indelicates had left Sad Gnome to join another independent label, Weekender Records, and in July released "Julia, We Don't Live in the 60s" as a CD single and 7" vinyl. The latter featured "Point Me to the West" as a B-side, while the CD release added to that song a live version of "Unity Mitford". Artrocker magazine called "Julia ..." "intelligent, poetic indie-rock". The Guardian called the song "reasonably agreeable", while noting that for a rock song that was "not really a compliment". Gigwise, reviewing a live rendition of the song, cited its "soaring riffs" and "wry, nostalgic and deliciously doom-laden" lyrics. Eddie Argos appeared in the music video.

The band's final single of 2007 was "Sixteen", released on 8 October on CD, 7" vinyl and digitally. The vinyl release contained "Sixteen" and B-side "The Sequel to Peter Pan and Wendy", while the CD release also featured a remix of "Fun is for the Feeble Minded". Julia said that "'Sixteen' is a song about people never growing up, and behaving like little kids for as long as possible, even when it bites them in the arse (at the age of 29)."

Several industry publications, including Rolling Stone, had predicted mainstream success for the Indelicates for several years, and though the band had achieved popularity in the blogosphere, by the start of 2008 a breakout hit had eluded them.

On 24 March 2008, the band released its fourth single, "America" on CD, 7" vinyl and digitally. The vinyl release B-side "No Religion" was joined by "The Last Bombed City" on the CD release. (Note: Of "The Last Bombed City" Julia said: "[The song] is much more about how it feels to live in a century that really, REALLY got fucked by the World Wars, in that they both allowed for a great number of cultural and political changes, but destroyed any stable notion of the godlike. It’s about taking responsibility, about fathers, and most importantly about fascism.") Clash magazine called the song an "entertaining polemic, whose lack of subtlety extends to the suitably big, brash rock musical soundtrack." Room Thirteen said the song was "truly refreshing ... a great track which is up-beat and powerful" and said that both Simon and Julia's vocals were "excellent and certainly complement the political nature of their music." The reviewer also praised both B-sides, saying the release added up to a "knockout combination".

=== American Demo ===
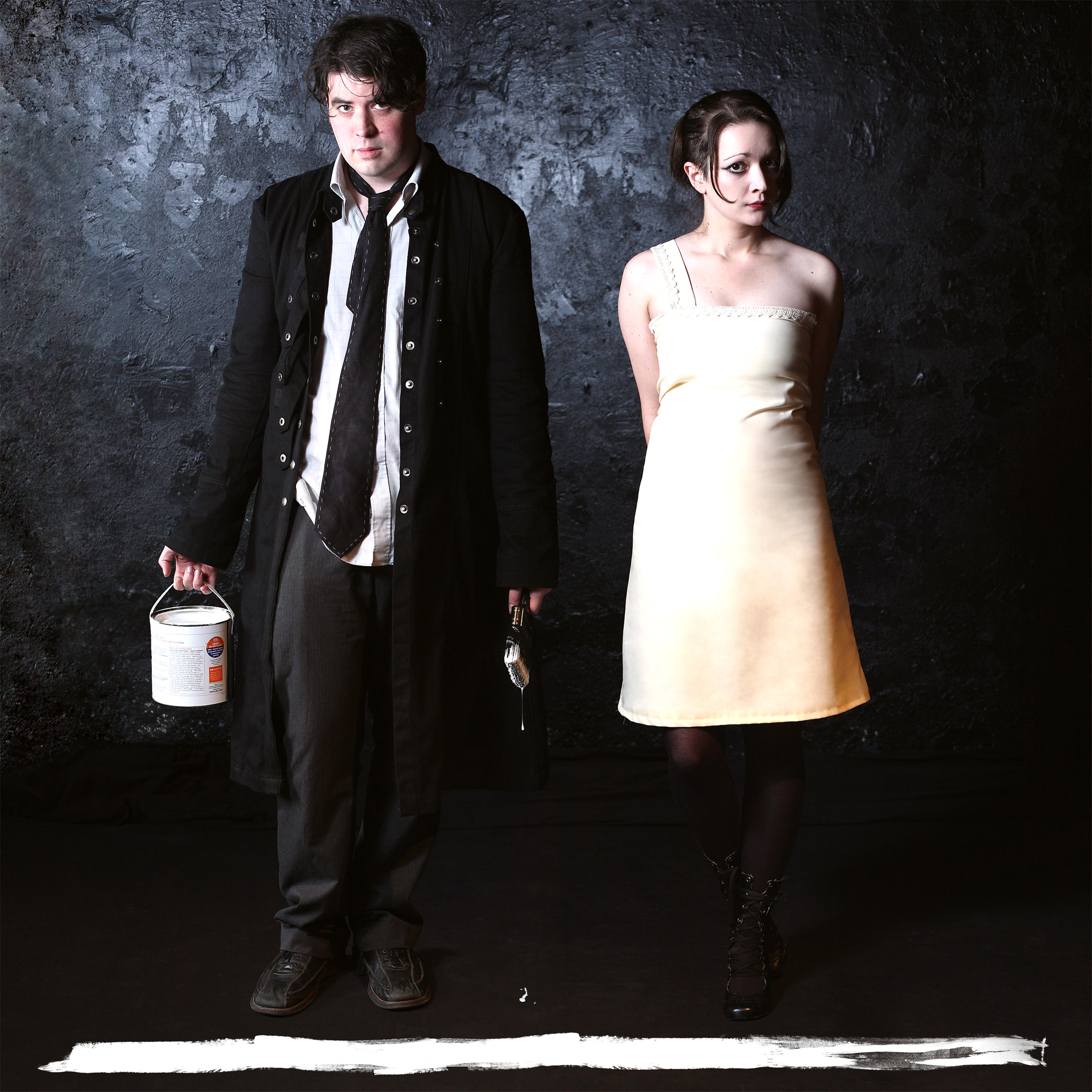
Simon and Julia on the cover of American Demo

"America" preceded the Indelicates' first album release, American Demo on 14 April 2008. Produced by Brian O'Shaughnessy at Bark Studio, and issued by Weekender on CD and as a 12" vinyl LP, the album featured 14 tracks and included new and previously released material. The album was released simultaneously in Germany through Weekender's sister label.

George Bass, writing for God is in The TV, called American Demo "rewardingly consistent" and said that it "breaks none of the promises [The Indelicates] have spent the last three years making". Bass remarked that while the album might look like "most machined poprock" it was "deeper than your average post-rock gatefold." He singled out critical favourite "New Art for the People" in particular as the band's signature track, "a raw monolith that's lost none of its veracity in the jump from the stage to the studio." Jo Vallance of Room Thirteen called the album a "fantastic debut" that "blows away all the indie bands claiming to make a difference and say something that counts" and further praised the album for its "variety of sound".

Neil Jones of MusicOMH called the album "a broad set of tracks that which spit immaculate bile here, vintage melodies there, and its very first track is a musical statement if ever I’ve heard one, Julia ... etching out a violin contrapuntal to make the hairs stand on end." Jones complimented the way the album married the album's "sweet" melodies with the more barbed lyrical content, and concluded, "Corrosive performance poetry and pop music passion, this is an album on immaculate themes. American Demo really is the aesthetic arm of the outsiders, and The Indelicates right now are pretty much unbeatable."

To support the album's release, the Indelicates toured Europe, notably Germany. They also headlined a stage at the Frequency Festival in Austria. The band played venues in the United States, including support for The Vaselines in New York, and at the South by Southwest festival in Austin, Texas.

Mayer Nissim, writing for Digital Spy, later said that American Demo had been "one of the best guitar-pop albums of the decade", while noting that "inevitably it didn't exactly set the charts alight". The Indelicates said that the album "didn't sell terribly".

== Corporate Records ==
=== Weekender split ===
"The reason the record industry was profitable was because it controlled a scarce resource – the ability to promote, distribute, manufacture and record music. All those things have been made almost free by the internet. Anyone who wants to record something in the morning [can make it] available to the world by teatime and you can be making money by dinnertime."

— 2010 interview with Digital Spy

In 2009, the Indelicates split from Weekender and in 2010 set up their own label, Corporate Records. The band had come to believe that Weekender's promotion of American Demo was ineffectual and did not account for the changing shape of the record industry, especially with regard to finding new fans, which the band said came about only through "the free, internet-based things that they did themselves." They went on to say that when their label ran out of money in December 2008, the removal of the album from sale prevented its chances of reaching a larger audience at Christmas after it appeared on some online best-of-the-year lists.

The Indelicates continued to play shows in the UK and Europe, and supported Amanda Palmer and Art Brut. By 2009, Kate Newberry had left the band, who were joined by Laurence Owen on bass and sometime guitarist and backing vocalist Lily Rae. The band continued with a rotating line-up for live shows. In early 2009, they released the download-only single "The Recession Song", which also featured Art Brut's Mikey Breyer. Author Laurie Penny said of the song, "I have been stamping around to it all day; it takes a very special song to make my heart hammer like a tiny flywheel, and this is it."

In early 2009, Weekender had said that it intended to move away from record production into artist management, and unsure if the label would exercise its contractual right to a second album, the Indelicates asked to be released from their contract. In January 2010, the label closed its UK operations entirely.

Corporate Records was a joint venture with musician Keith Top of the Pops, who had produced the studio version of "We Hate the Kids". After deciding to self-release their second album, the band decided that the label could serve a wider audience than just themselves. The Corporate Records website invited artists to "promote, share and sell their work" and let fans download work on a pay-what-you-like basis. Apart from a PayPal charge and 20% "server costs and admin" the Corporate Records contract promised 80% of the proceeds of sales to artists.

=== Songs for Swinging Lovers ===
"Invigorated and full of vitriol after breaking free from the company that put out their debut, the Indelicates set up their own anyone-can-sign label and released a pop masterpiece. This venom with hooks is seen best on 'Your Money', but the spirited catchiness continues strong throughout. Highlights: 'Ill's manic pop thrill, the feminist critique 'Flesh', and the stunning 'Savages'.”

— Aug Stone in The Quietus, 2018.

On 12 April 2010, the Indelicates released their second album, Songs for Swinging Lovers, through the Corporate Records website for the UK, US and other territories, except Germany, where it was released through Snowhite Records (in conjunction with Universal Music Group) on 10 December. The album was produced by Ed East and recorded at Studio East in Berlin, with additional recording by Keith TOTP at Dean Street Studios in London. The band released the CD version on 2 June, and a 12" vinyl special edition followed.

The Indelicates also made available a "Super Special Edition"—a £300 package including the "CD, signed vinyl, exclusive download, art/poster book, lyric book, signed print, jewellery, fudge and rope." The special edition also included a live performance of the album at "any UK venue" which would be recorded and the copyright for that recording given to the buyer, who could then sell the recording on the Corporate Records website if they wished.

Simon said that musically the album better represented what the band heard in their heads, and that American Demo had been compromised through being produced under the constraints of a label. Julia said that Songs for Swinging Lovers was a more personal album, citing "Savages" in particular. Writing for PopMatters, Maria Schurr said of the album's style that while it represented a continuation of American Demo's "lyrical attacks on society coated over with giddy indie pop hooks" Songs for Swinging Lovers "has been infused with a swish of cabaret." She later said that it sounded like "[a] collaboration between The Mekons, The Wedding Present, Carter USM, and Luke Haines, with a song co-written by Jacques Brel following a really awesome séance". Schurr said that the album was "dazzlingly close to perfection" and though its first half was its strongest, the second was "more convincing of the Indelicates' greatness than ten years' worth of 'Next Big Thing' issues of NME".

In Digital Spy Mayer Nissim wrote that Songs for Swinging Lovers lacked "a bit of the coherence and gloss 'n' polish" of American Demo, but that it was "an assured, aggressive follow-up". He said that, as with their debut, "The Indelicates' trick is to suck you in with hooks that have you either dancing or swooning before the lyrics smash you in the chops." Nissim singled out "Roses" as the album's standout and "Sympathy for the Devil" as an "odd misstep", concluding that while the Indelicates were doing nothing new musically, Songs for Swinging Lovers showed "that it really is what you do with it that counts".

The album was also praised by Neil Gaiman, and in Germany's Intro magazine, Jack Black singled out Julia's voice especially for praise, saying, "I love her." In 2018, The Quietus ranked Songs for Swinging Lovers at No. 72 on its writers' poll list of "The Top 100 Albums of the Quietus' Existence" (2008–2018), calling it a "pop masterpiece".

In the absence of traditional chart tracking for the album, the band said the measure of success for Songs for Swinging Lovers would be "if we're financially solvent ... success is basically not having to stop". Just over a year later, the band reported that it had sold well enough to fund the recording and release of their next album. (Note: According to the Indelicates Songs for Swinging Lovers had by May 2011 sold "5,000 downloads ... a whole bunch of CDs and LPs and quite a few £300 Super Special Limited Editions".)

=== Digital rights campaigning ===
In early 2010 the Indelicates became outspoken critics of the controversial Digital Economy Act 2010, which allowed the blocking of sites used or even likely to be used for activities that involved copyright infringement. Having encouraged fans to share songs via their blogs and on social media, the band said that filesharing had "directly benefited" them, and that the new law was "fuzzy enough to include our artist-rewarding, innovative-business-model-y company aiming to grow the digital economy."

Simon urged bands to examine the true value of a sale and whether "an income they [aren't] getting anyway" was worth removal of rights from "real" people. After Parliament approved the bill and it became an Act of law, Simon hit out at the bands who had stayed silent: "All the musicians who view the internet as nothing more than a funnel for their sleazy hype deserve their share of the blame. Standing by silently with their unblemished hands folded cravenly over their purses ... Indie bands – This was done in your name and you could have crippled their argument by standing against it but chose not to." The band would later address an all-party group of MPs at Parliament to present on the subject of digital rights.

=== David Koresh Superstar ===
David Koresh Superstar is a concept album about David Koresh and the Waco siege in 1993, during which 82 members of the religious sect Branch Davidian (including their leader, Koresh) and four personnel within the Bureau of Alcohol, Tobacco, and Firearms (ATF) law enforcement were killed. The album was released in the UK on 16 May 2011 and in the US on 24 May, through Corporate Records. It was re-released in the US with additional material in October 2011 to coincide with the Indelicates' first US tour. According to the band, the album's style is a mix of "rebel" country music, luau, disco and rock opera. It was recorded at Ramble Creek Studio in Austin, Texas with producer Britton Beisenherz, and at Bark Studio in London with producer Brian O’Shaugnessy.

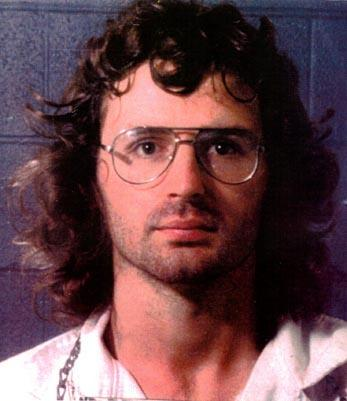
David Koresh Superstar is a concept album about the life of Vernon Howell (later David Koresh).

Koresh also features guest vocals from Jim Bob of Carter USM, Mikey Georgeson (Note: Also known by his stage name, The Vessel.) of David Devant and his Spirit Wife, Philip Jeays and Lily Rae, plus members of Luxembourg, The Boyfriends and Keith Top of the Pops & His Minor UK Indie Celebrity All-Star Backing Band. The bulk of recording had taken place by Summer 2010, with additional recording, mixing and mastering carried out towards the end of 2010. The Indelicates reported at the time that they were seeking financing to turn the album into a feature film, and later self-published David Koresh Superstar: An Unfilmable Screenplay. To promote the album ahead of its release, the band made available preview track "Something's Goin' Down in Waco", and created a video game, Super David Koresh Attack.

At PopMatters, Maria Schurr called David Koresh Superstar the Indelicates' "most ambitious undertaking to date" and that they had "done a stunning job at making history intriguing". In particular Schurr praised Julia and Simon's "strong, dramatic singing voices [as] suited to the material" while noting that Simon's American accent as Koresh was "convincing enough" but overindulgent during the album's second song, "The Road From Houston to Waco". She also praised the performances of Philip Jeays (as an ATF member) and Jim Bob (playing Timothy McVeigh). Schurr said that the album's high point was "Something's Goin' Down in Waco", which "gives a vivid illustration of the rapidly escalating events" and concluded that while Koresh "peaks and dives" and may "drag a bit", it was worth persevering with for the closing track, a "blistering rendition" of the folk song "John the Revelator".

In Christian news magazine World, Arsenio Orteza wrote that the album "[gets] to the core of cult and conspiracy-theory mentality" and that the songs "A Single Thrown Grenade" and "I Don't Care If It's True" "articulate megalomania and its discontents at their most sadly poignant." Contrasting the album with the Broadway musical The Book of Mormon, Orteza said that where that musical mocked its subject matter, the Indelicates' intention was to understand, and that "The extent to which they succeed is chilling."

David Koresh Superstar was written before Songs for Swinging Lovers, as the band had initially wanted to release a concept album to avoid difficult second album syndrome. Simon later said he regretted describing Koresh as a concept album, as it gave the impression it existed outside the "main continuity" of the band, and the perception that it was a "side project" may have harmed its popularity with the band's fans.

=== Diseases of England ===
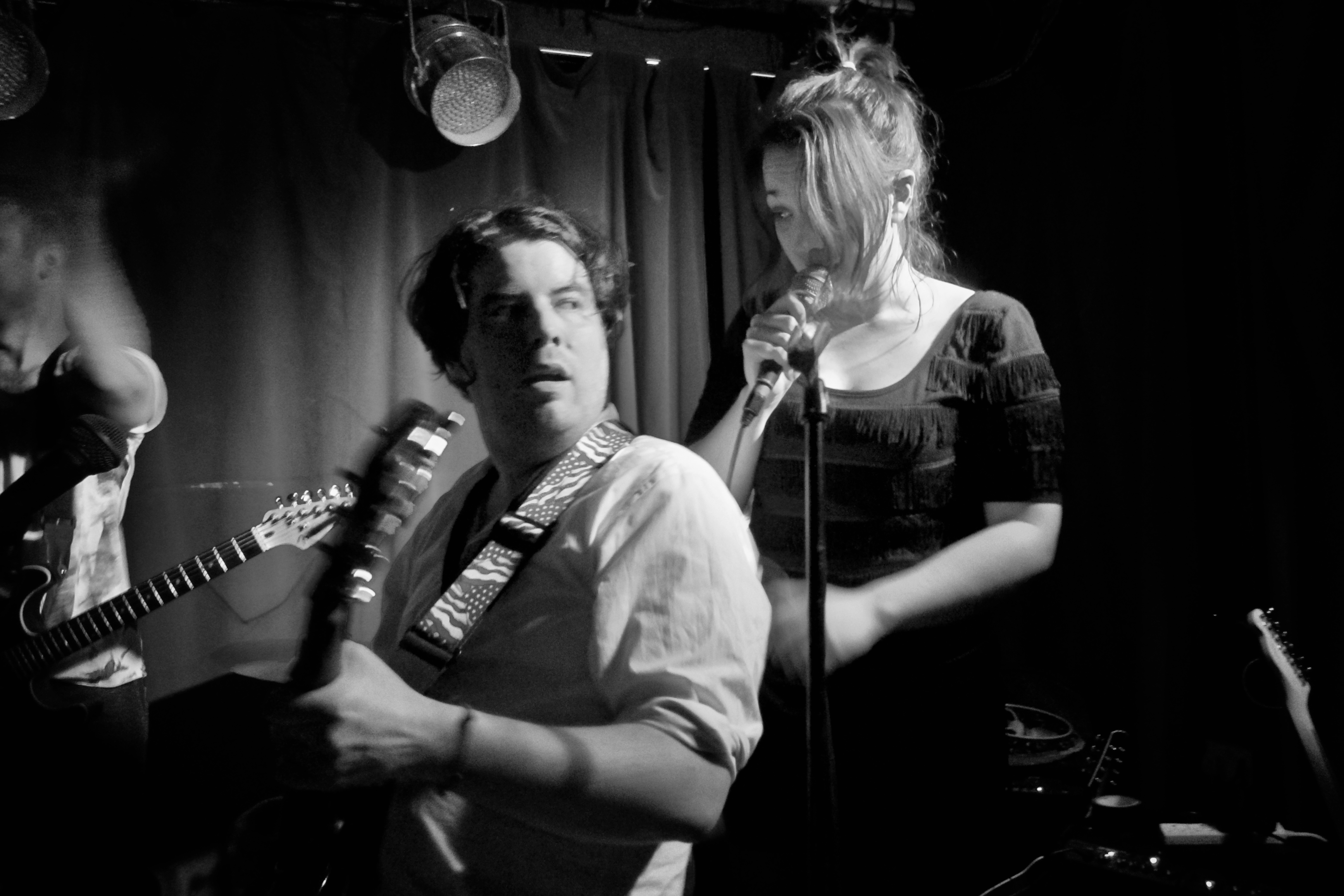
The Indelicates at the Diseases of England album launch, 25 April 2013

Diseases of England, the Indelicates' fourth album, was initially released in three parts, each consisting of four songs. The band recorded and released Part II first, in October 2012. The remainder of the album was recorded later, after a successful crowdfunding campaign and funding from pre-orders. Special edition pre-order packages included "The Scott Tenorman's Parents Memorial Edition" (Note: The season five South Park episode "Scott Tenorman Must Die" includes a scene in which the band Radiohead (playing themselves) taunt Scott Tenorman and call him "totally not cool". With "The Scott Tenorman's Parents Memorial Edition", the Indelicates promised to "go up to any kid you nominate and tell him that he's the uncoolest kid we've ever seen".) for £200 and "Official Corporate Sponsorship" for £10,000. The band released Part I at the end of December 2012, and completed the album with the release of Part III on 25 April 2013. The Indelicates also ran a successful Kickstarter campaign to fund the 12" vinyl edition. To promote the album, the band released a videos for the song "Class" on 10 September 2012 and "I Used to Sing" on 17 September.

God Is in the TV praised the first two tracks ("Bitterness is the Appropriate Response" and "Pubes") as having "more muscle" and as a departure from the band's usual style, but lamented that the rest of the album did not follow suit. The reviewer concluded that it remained "a fine album, with some great instrumentation and clever lyrics". Author and journalist Kieron Gillen singled out "Not Alone" as one of his songs of the year, "their Everybody Hurts, but with all the necessary cruelty to make us cynics swallow it."

Maria Schurr of PopMatters said that Diseases of England "is as grand as anything in the duo’s back catalog" while being somewhat "slower and less reliant on humour" than the band's previous albums. She also noted the different tone of the first two tracks, from which the album moves to a more deliberate pace replacing their "youthful defiance" with "potent revulsion". Schurr said that while approximately "90% of the songs on here evoke filthy streets mottled with contaminated rainwater ... the Indelicates are the band that can make such unsavory visions inviting". She concluded that the album was "a grimily beautiful release worthy of the heart that was put in to it".

The Indelicates also released music videos for "Not Alone", "Everything Is Just Disgusting"—which features puppets of the band—and the machinima "Dovahkiin", which was created using the video game The Elder Scrolls V: Skyrim. In October 2013, the band also released Part IV of "Diseases of England" as DLC, consisting of four new songs recorded at Dean Street Studios with Keith TOTP, and ten demo versions of other songs from the album, recorded at Simon and Julia's home.

=== Elevator Music ===
By 2013, the Indelicates remained somewhat popular and acclaimed in Germany, but had still found success in the UK elusive. After analysing the band's website traffic, Simon claimed that larger numbers of visitors had come from "obvious places" such as London and New York, but the remainder were single-person hits from "pretty much every city I've ever heard of". He concluded, "So we’re an unsuccessful band, but on a global scale!" Simon and Julia had also gathered an almost entirely new backing line-up for live shows, including Benny Lewis (drums) and Nick Kos (bass), who would remain with the band thereafter.

In 2014, the Indelicates worked on creating a musical, (Note: What would later become Paradise Rocks) but found the logistical challenges at odds with the band's availability, especially after Julia became pregnant with the couple's first child. Instead, they decided to work on recording and releasing a new album, Elevator Music. Julia said that recording of some of her vocals had to be delayed until after she gave birth "as you lose a lot of lung capacity when pregnant".

"It’s the story of what happens when the internet achieves consciousness. It’s a fact that there are now more connections in the global communications network than in the human brain, and people using it act a bit like neurons, processing and resending information. Once conscious, the internet starts reading Twitter and becomes so annoyed that it just fucks off into outer space, plunging humanity back into the Dark Ages. The internet then splits itself into two personalities and tries to construct a virtual reality 'Eden', but things don’t go to plan."

— Simon on The Indelicates' concept album, Elevator Music.

In November 2014, the Indelicates released their first single from Elevator Music, "The Generation That Nobody Remembered". At the same time as creating the album, Simon had acquired a virtual reality headset, the Oculus Rift, and said that the album and the technology "fed into each other" with virtual reality "a big part of the album’s songs and story". "The Generation That Nobody Remembered" was backed with "possibly the first" virtual reality music video. Designed for use with an Xbox 360 controller and Oculus Rift HMD (while also being compatible with Development Kit 2), the video featured three scenes with different situations and control schemes. Simon described the intention of intentional listening environments was to "[recapture] some of the magic of the HMV listening booth or the bedroom record player and bringing music back out from the background – while adding emotional weight with short narrative experiences that mesh with and enhance the songs."

Maria Schurr of PopMatters, while praising the innovative marketing, said that the song "deserves repeat plays in its own right, with the sort of vital generational commentary that so many current bands fail to provide". Schurr also said that the song's "lush and orchestral" style represented a musical evolution for the band.

Elevator Music was officially released on 13 October 2015, though fans who pre-ordered the album could receive a digital copy early, and the download-only version could be bought from August 2015. The CD and double vinyl editions were released on 20 November. The album was mainly recorded at Simon and Julia's home studio and produced by Simon, with additional material ("choirs and live drums") recorded at Dean Street Studios with Keith TOTP. As with the band's previous Corporate Records album releases, also available were several special edition packages, including the usual in-person live recording where the copyright for the recording would be handed over to the buyer, and a "Mark of the Beast" edition for £666, for which the band said they would "re-record all the vocals for you with metal-style screams and send you the results". To coincide with the album's release, the band made a video for "Beyond the Radio Horizon" as a 360-degree (or "spherical") video, which would allow users to look around as the video played.

The album's style was described as a departure from the band's previous music, "[covering] an even greater range of styles than you’d usually expect" from them, including "a cappella folksong and glam thrash" amid "power pop, cabaret punk and prog rock". Simon reluctantly called Elevator Music a concept album (owing to an aversion for the term after using it to describe David Koresh Superstar), saying it was about "what happens when the Internet achieves consciousness".

=== Juniverbrecher ===
The Indelicates released their sixth album, Juniverbrecher, digitally on 23 July 2017, the anniversary of the Brexit referendum. It was described by the band as about banishing the "Jimmy Savile/Mr. Punch/Brexit" demon. Recording the album, Simon and Julia were joined by band members Alastair Clayton, Nick Kos and Benny Lewis, plus violinist Louisa Wood. To promote the album, the band played venues in London and Brighton and toured Germany, where they were supported by London indie rock band Fightmilk. Heather Newton took over on violin for the tour. Writer Kieron Gillen named the track "Everything English Is the Enemy" from the album as his #9 song of 2017.

== Other work ==
Book of Job: The Musical was written by Simon and has been performed by Simon, Julia and others since 2005. Described by Simon as "an Andrew Lloyd Webber type Biblical musical done in a very threadbare way, with the narrator describing what would be happening if the show had a Lloyd Webber style budget for sets, cast and effects" the musical is usually performed with a cast of six people and with one acoustic guitar. The band revive the musical "every couple of years" and have performed it at venues around the UK, including Brighton, London, the Edinburgh Festival, Cheltenham Literary Festival, and the Ledbury Poetry Festival. Gary Bills-Geddes, writing for the Worcester News, called the musical "one of the most memorable and enjoyable things" he had seen.

The Indelicates released a two-part recording of the musical through the Corporate Records website—the first part on 28 February 2011 and the second on 7 March. Recorded at Dean Street Studios by Keith TOTP, the release featured Simon, Julia and Alastair from the band, plus Mary Hampton, Chris Hodges, Sarah Pinkney, Laurie Penny and Michael Parker. Mikey Georgeson of David Devant and his Spirit Wife cameos. In 2015, Simon and Julia also created a children's show, Goblins Live, for which they made the puppets and set decoration, and which they performed at local venues.

Paradise Rocks is a musical set in the 1960s "in the style of an Elvis movie" and is based on the 17th century epic poem Paradise Lost by John Milton. Written by Simon in 2014, the musical was not performed until 2018 owing to the logistical challenges involved. Unlike Book of Job: The Musical, Paradise Rocks required a larger number of actors, musicians and technicians. The Indelicates, with The Devil's Party Theatre Company, performed the musical at venues in the UK through 2019, including the Ledbury Poetry Festival, the Brighton Fringe festival and in London. For Fringe Review, Robin Manuell said that the musical was "the most all round entertaining show I have had the pleasure to see" and that the songs were "excellent". He also praised director Lex Lake and choreographer Roger Duncan for "the quality of the ensemble work". Manuell said that while the cast all had moments of excellence and the singing was of a high standard, during the performance he saw "not all the performers can keep this up all the time" and some were "patchy". He nevertheless concluded that Paradise Rocks was "an outstanding play and an outstanding production".

== Discography ==
=== Albums ===
- American Demo – Weekender Records – April 2008
- Songs for Swinging Lovers – Corporate Records – April 2010
- David Koresh Superstar – Corporate Records – May 2011
- Diseases of England – Corporate Records – 2013
- Elevator Music – Corporate Records – 2015
- Juniverbrecher – Corporate Records – 2017
- Avenue QAnon – Corporate Records – 2024

=== Singles ===
- "We Hate the Kids" – Sad Gnome Records – July 2006
- "Julia, We Don't Live in the '60s" – Weekender Records – July 2007
- "Sixteen" – Weekender Records – October 2007
- "America" – Weekender Records – March 2008
- "The Recession Song" – Corporate Records – February 2009
- "Something Going Down in Waco" – Corporate Records – 2011
- "I Am Koresh" – Corporate Records – 2011
- "The Generation That Nobody Remembered" – November 2014
- "Beyond the Radio Horizon" – August 2015
- "Top of the Pops" – June 2017
- "Cold War Bop" - January 2024
- "4CHAN (There's something going down on /POL/)" - June 2024

=== EPs ===
- "The Last Significant Statement To Be Made in Rock'n'Roll" – Sad Gnome Records – February 2007
