= Dior Homme =

French clothing retailer for menswear

Dior Homme is the menswear division of Christian Dior SA, the French clothing retailer. As of 2025, the artistic director of Dior Men is former Loewe director Jonathan Anderson.

== History ==
Dior's menswear line was originally called Christian Dior Monsieur, then Dior Homme, and presently Dior Men.

Christian Dior Monsieur was founded by Marc Bohan in 1969, then creative director of the women's and haute couture line of Dior.

In 2000, the menswear line was renamed Dior Homme under the creative direction of Hedi Slimane from the fall/winter 2001-02 season. Under Slimane's direction, the label introduced a characteristic slim silhouette which soon took off within the fashion industry. The early collections delved into the exploration of the male sex. The first denim designs for men at Dior were launched for spring 2003. The look darkened during the Luster period which was inspired by the electroscene of Berlin. From 2004 A/W, Dior Homme delved into exploring the different styles of Rock and Roll. The logo currently used by Dior Men is a bee, usually in the bottom right-hand side of knitwear and the top right side in polo shirts.

Following Slimane's departure in 2007, Kris Van Assche implemented a more formal and minimal style. Over the seasons, he softened the black stiff silhouette which had become too cliché and opted for models who add an athletic look to the spindly Dior Homme silhouette. This new look was characterized by attention to details and color palette of shades of black, gray, blue or brown.

In late 2007 Dior Homme began producing a six-piece men's skin care range, with Slimane designing the packaging. The skin care range is available for sale in France and department stores in many other countries.

From 2018 to 2025, Kim Jones served as the artistic director of Dior Men. Under Jones's leadership, the Dior menswear line changed its name to Dior Men in March 2018. In 2023, he introduced a capsule collection dedicated to denim.

Dior Men named Jonathan Anderson as creative director on April 17, 2025 following his exit from Loewe. On June 2, 2025, LVMH further announced Anderson would concurrently serve as creative director for womenswear, menswear, and haute couture across all categories for Dior.

== Collections ==
Season	Title	Runway Soundtrack
Autumn/Winter 2001	SOLITAIRE	Inner Cycle / Solitaire 1 & 2 by Benjamin Diamond
Spring/Summer 2002	RED	Boys Don't Cry & Domino Heart by Nicholas Lemercier
Autumn/Winter 2002	REFLEXION	Flexion 1 & 2 by Readymade FC
Spring/Summer 2003	FOLLOW ME	F. Me 1 & 2 by Readymade FC
Autumn/Winter 2003	LUSTER	Change Yourself by Bosco
Spring/Summer 2004	STRIP	Strip by DSL
Autumn/Winter 2004	Unnamed. Unofficial name: "VICTIM OF THE CRIME"	Victim of The Crime by Phoenix
Spring/Summer 2005	Unnamed. Unofficial names: "(UNTITLED)" & "BECK"	Dior Theme by Beck
Autumn/Winter 2005	Unnamed or EVERYBODY JUST LOOKS THE SAME. Unofficial name: "IN THE MORNING"	In The Morning by Razorlight
Spring/Summer 2006	Unnamed. Unofficial name: "THE WORLD WAS A MESS, BUT HIS HAIR WAS PERFECT"	The World Was a Mess, But His Hair Was Perfect by The Rakes
Autumn/Winter 2006	Unnamed. Unofficial name: "THESE GREY DAYS"	These Grey Days by Eight Legs
Spring/Summer 2007	WE LOOK GOOD TOGETHER	We Look Good Together by Littl'ans
Autumn/Winter 2007	NAVIGATE	Navigate, Navigate by These New Puritans
Fall/Winter 2008	"Lumiere Du Nord"	Wim Mertens (Song title: Wound to Wound)
Spring/Summer 2009	"Planisphere"	Justice (Song title: Planisphere)
Fall/Winter 2009	"Angles"	Malcolm McLaren (Song title: Deep In Vogue)
Spring/Summer 2010	"Cold Love"	Ghinzu (Song title: Cold Love)
Fall/Winter 2010	"Coal"	The Sisters of Mercy feat Ofra Haza (Song title: Temple of Love 1992)
Spring/Summer 2011	"Lessness"	Shigeru Umebayashi (Song title: 2046 Main Theme)
Fall/Winter 2011	"Enfold/Unfold"	Grauzone (Song title: Eisbär)
Spring/Summer 2012	"Less And More"	Gater (Song title: Taboo - Requiem for a Dream Remix)
Fall/Winter 2012	"A Soldier on My Own"	Woodkid (Song title: Iron)
Spring/Summer 2013	"Light"	Koudlam (Song title: Love Song)
Fall/Winter 2013		Anne Clark (Song title: Our Darkness)
Spring/Summer 2014		Pet Shop Boys (Song title: Paninaro)

== Advertising ==
For its advertising campaigns, Dior Men worked with photographers including Willy Vanderperre, Larry Clark, Karl Lagerfeld, David Sims, Patrick Demarchelier, Steven Meisel, Alasdair McLellan and Pieter Hugo.

The campaigns have featured Lucas Hedges, Kylian Mbappé (2021), Raphaël Quenard (2023), Louis Garrel (2024) and Robert Pattinson (2016, 2017, 2023, 2024).

== Other projects ==
In 2017, Dior Homme collaborated with audio manufacturer Sennheiser to produce a special line of four headphones.

In 2020, Dior Men launched its first men’s ski capsule, in collaboration with specialist brands Descente, AK Skis and POC.

== See also ==
- Christian Dior
