= Tarred and Feathered =

Tarring and feathering is a form of public torture.

Tarred and Feathered may refer to:

- Tarred and Feathered (EP), by The Hives, 2010
- "Tarred and Feathered", a song by Cardiacs from the 1987 mini-album Big Ship
- "Tarred and Feathered", a song by Dogs from the 2005 album Turn Against This Land
