= Helen Jackson =

Helen Jackson may refer to:

- Helen Hunt Jackson (1830–1885), American writer
- Helen M. Gougar or Helen Mar Jackson (1843–1907), American attorney
- Helen Jackson (tennis) (fl. 1895), English tennis player
- Helen Viola Jackson (1919–2020), the last surviving American Civil War widow
- Helen J. Frye or Helen Jackson (1930–2011), American judge
- Helen Jackson (politician) (born 1939), British politician
- Helen Williams (model) or Helen Williams Jackson, American model
- Helen Jackson, sponsor of USS Bremerton (SSN-698)
- Helen Jackson, musician in Brontosaurus Chorus

== Fictional ==
- Helen Jackson, a character in Son of Ingagi
- Helen Jackson, a Mobile Suit Victory Gundam character
