= Weekender club =

Music venue in Innsbruck, Tyrol, Austria

The Weekender Club and Weekender Café was a music venue in Innsbruck, Tyrol, Austria. It programmed a broad variety of musical events reaching from live concerts and club nights with DJs, through to album release parties and guest events. In May 2017 it was closed, but there are still concerts presented by weekender in Innsbruck taking place.

== Program ==
Although the venues name indicates club nights on the weekend, it is also run throughout the week. The café is open from 6:00pm to 2:00am, Monday to Saturday and occasionally provides the guests with live DJ music (for example, “Justin’s Jukebox” on Thursdays). The club has regular club nights with free entry:

- Monday: ‘’Student’s Night’’ – features a live concert, drinks specials and DJ Philips playing indie, alternative and electro music
- Friday: “Beat It!” – hosted by DJ Scooterman playing electronic rock and beats
- Saturday: “Urban Hymns” – hosted by DJ Anderson playing indie, Britpop & -rock

Once a month, also with free entry, there will be a “60s Mod Night”, a “Rock’n’Pop Girl Power Night” and a “Weekender Records Night” – that will feature a live concert from a band released on Weekender Records. Next to this regular program, there are live concerts in the club and sometimes acoustic shows in the café, guest events such as film release parties and even broadcastings of important football games on a mega screen in the café.

== Location and architecture ==
Though Weekender started in the autumn of 2006, the building had been used as a music venue since the 80s under the Name Utopia. What used to be a warehouse now provides an impressive location for a music club and café, an architects’ office and an art studio. The club is in the basement; above it is the café, which has similarity with an art gallery due to its great collection of paintings of famous musicians. Another highlight are the men's toilet facilities! A true feeling of rock’n’roll can be experienced when using the urinals that have the shape of an open mouth which brings to the mind the famous Mick Jagger.

== Music ==
A wide range of genres is offered such as indie, alternative, britpop, rock, grunge, emo, soul, electronica and music from the 50s and 60s.

== History ==
The idea for Weekender was developed by British born Justin Barwick, resident to Innsbruck and local DJ Andreas Franzelin. They got to know each other through their work as DJs in Innsbruck and frequently travelled to Munich, Zurich, Vienna and London to see concerts by bands from the indie and alternative rock scene. Being big music fans, they were frustrated about the lack of live shows in Innsbruck and started realising their idea for a live venue in 2005. After renting the then called ‘’nu.topia’’ for events on about 15 single nights, it was decided that they would start taking things more seriously and make “Weekender” their full-time profession. The two took over nu.topia in 2006 and after a restoration phase of barely three months during the summer, the venue was geared with complete new bar and stage equipment, new installations for lighting and sound. Since then the Weekender has quickly become established in Innsbruck's music and club scene and has put Innsbruck on the European map as a premier touring venue for many bands. (See all bands that played at Weekender on the homepage featured in the web links)

After 11 years Weekender was closed due to noise disturbances of people living next to it.

== Origin of the name ==
It generates from two names with a similar idea. Firstly, the term Weekender that was used in the UK in the 60s, associated with non-stop music events that featured live concerts. Secondly, Weekender was a hit in the early nineties by the band Flowered Up. Along with it came a 15-minute music video (see YouTube web link) which demonstrates, in an exaggerated way, the escape from the workday week that ends on Friday and dives into a weekend of clubbing, drinking, dancing and partying without limits.
