= Tall Stories from Under the Table =

Tall Stories From Under the Table

Studio album by Dogs
- Released: 25 June 2007
- Recorded: Miloco Garden Studio, Shoreditch, England; Raezor Studio, Wandsworth, England
- Genre: Rock, punk rock
- Length: 41:10
- Label: Weekender Records
- Producer: Steve Musters

Dogs chronology
Turn Against This Land (2005)	Tall Stories From Under the Table (2007)	We Are The Dogs (2010)

Professional ratings
Review scores
Source	Rating
Virgin Media	3.5/5 stars
PopMatters	7/10
NME	3/10
Obscure Sound	7.6/10
Stylus Magazine	D+

Tall Stories From Under the Table is the second and final album from the London-based band Dogs, released in 2007.

== Track listing ==
1. "Dirty Little Shop" - 3:48
2. "Soldier On" - 3:11
3. "Winston Smith" - 3:33
4. "This Stone Is a Bullet" - 3:24
5. "Chained to No-One" - 3:18
6. "Forget It All" - 3:42
7. "Little Pretenders" - 2:49
8. "On a Bridge, By a Pub" - 2:36
9. "Who Are Yu" - 3:31
10. "These Days" - 3:40
11. "By The River" - 4:29
12. "Let It Lay" (feat. Paul Weller) - 3:16
