= Linda's Nephew =

Band from Cambridgeshire, England

- Origin: Cambridgeshire, England
- Genres: Pop, Rock, Indie, Electronic
- Years active: 2005-Present
- Label: Rrratle Records
- Members: Jaime Randall; James Cuthbert; Tom Wilkes
- Past members: Matthew Bunnage; Tom Allerton; Rob Barr

Linda's Nephew is a band from Cambridgeshire, England. The band consists of Jaime Randall (vocals and guitars), James Cuthbert (vocals and keyboards) and Tom Wilkes (drums).

== Biography ==
Originally a 4-piece cover band, Linda's Nephew was formed after Randall, Cuthbert, and previous members Matthew Bunnage and Tom Allerton met in a music lesson at St. Peter's Secondary School, Huntingdon. The band's current incarnation was formed towards the end of 2005.

2006 saw the band being featured in the Radar section of NME and the band's song 'Not Enough Forward Planning' earned the honour of being Steve Lamacq's demo of the week on his 'In New Music We Trust' show on BBC Radio 1

The band toured extensively throughout England in 2007 and 2008, playing house parties and supporting Enter Shikari, The Dykeenies, I Was a Cub Scout, Rolo Tomassi and oddly, From The Jam.

The song 'Michael Barrymore' was played by Kissy Sell Out in the summer of 2008 on his 'In New DJs We Trust' on Radio 1 and the band was named Unsigned Band of the Month for June.

Jaime joined Look See Proof as keyboardist and vocalist in August 2008.

== Discography ==
=== EP ===
Bear - CD
1. Health Challenged, Survival Impaired
2. Goddamnit, Leroy
3. Michael Barrymore Counted To Seven. Then It Ended.
4. Not Enough Forward Planning
Release: October 2008
Label: Rrratle Records
