= The Dash =

English post-punk band

The Dash are a post-punk band based in the Whitechapel area of London. The band have released several singles and two EPs as well as playing hundreds of gigs including a recent month-long tour of Europe supporting Kitty, Daisy & Lewis.

== History ==
The band comprises Marc Hayward (lead vocals/guitar), Dan Williams (guitar/backing vocals), Aiden Pryor (bass) and Gareth Tyler (drums). The band cite 1970s punk rock and post punk as influences, including Iggy Pop, Television, and The Clash.

Their debut single "Broomhouse Road" was released through Weekender Records at the end of 2008 and garnered healthy reviews from the music press. Ben Marwood of Drowned in Sound described it as "three yobs yelling about London for seven minutes", giving it a 7 out of 10 rating.

The Notes From The Bunker EP was released on 11 October 2010 on Dashtones as a digital release and reached as far as number 8 in the Amazon download chart.

They recorded three tracks with Mick Whitnall of Babyshambles which were slated for release in 2011, but remained unreleased. A single, "Let's Surf", a cover version of the Nightingales song featuring Terry Edwards, was released in 2011.

The Dash released '3 Time More' through Tin Pan Recordings in 2013 which led to the band supporting Babyshambles and also filming a television commercial for the fragrance Impulse in Berlin, Germany, which produced a digital-only cover of The Ramones' "Baby I Love You".

Produced by Brian O'Shaughnessy (Primal Scream, My Bloody Valentine), the band's next single 'Love Will Always Be The End' was released in October 2014 and was championed by BBC 6 Music DJs Steve Lamacq and Tom Robinson.

The Dash announced on New Years Day 2015 that they would be supporting Kitty, Daisy & Lewis on their Feb/March UK & European tour. The tour visited 11 countries and played to over 35,000 people in just a month.

Through Gritted Teeth, an EP of brand new songs written by Hayward and Williams, was set for release on 30 October 2015.

== Discography ==
=== EPs, singles ===
- "Broomhouse Road" (2008), Weekender
- "Notes from the Bunker" EP (2010), Dashtones
- "You Can't Please Everyone" (2010), Dastones
- "Let's Surf" (2011) - with Terry Edwards, split with Darren Hayman
- "3 Times More" (2013), Tin Pan Recordings
- "Fell In Love With Back Of My Hand" (2013), Tin Pan Recordings
- "Baby I Love You" (2014), Tin Pan Recordings
- "Love Will Always Be The End" (2014), Tin Pan Recordings
- "Through Gritted Teeth" EP (2015), Dashtones
