= We Hate the Kids =

Single by The Indelicates
- Released: July 2006
- Recorded: 2006
- Genre: Dark Cabaret; Indie rock Indie pop
- Length: 3.13
- Label: Sad Gnome Records

The Indelicates singles chronology
"We Hate the Kids" (2006)	"The Last Significant Statement EP" (2007)

"We Hate the Kids" was the first single by the British band The Indelicates. It was released at the end of July 2006 and was the first Sad Gnome Records release, as a 7" vinyl, only available through the labels official website. The single was also released as a Digital Download and was available on iTunes. Among the title track, two remixes of the song were also available to download, one of which was by The Art Goblins and Subliminal Girls (band) keyboardist Nicky Biscuit. The song was later re-recorded for their debut album, the newer version of the song contains many changes from the original, most notably, the bass line at the start of the song is now played on piano.

The album artwork depicts Simon Indelicate holding a gun to the mouth of Julia Indelicate.

== Track listing ==
=== 7" ===
1. "We Hate the Kids"
2. "Burn All the Photographs"

=== Download ===
1. "We Hate The Kids"
2. "Burn All The Photographs"
3. "The Kidz (Youth Club Indiscretion Remix) Remix By Nicky Biscuit"
4. "We Hate The Cyber Kids (Trance Mix) Ed Van Beinum"
