= Songs for Swinging Lovers (The Indelicates album) =

Second album by The Indelicates

Studio album by The Indelicates
- Released: 12 April 2010
- Recorded: Autumn 2009
- Genre: Dark cabaret, indie rock, indie pop
- Length: 52:37
- Label: Corporate Records
- Producer: Ed East

The Indelicates chronology
American Demo (2008)	Songs for Swinging Lovers (2010)	David Koresh Superstar (2011)

Professional ratings
Review scores
Source	Rating
Digital Spy	5/5 stars
PopMatters	9/10 stars

Songs for Swinging Lovers is the second album by The Indelicates, released on 12 April 2010. The album was recorded in Berlin in 2009 and produced by Ed East. Initially available for download "on a 'pay-what-you-like' basis", CD and special editions followed in June 2010.

== Track listing ==
1. Europe
2. Your Money
3. We Love You, Tania
4. Ill
5. Flesh
6. Savages
7. Roses
8. Sympathy for the Devil
9. Be Afraid of Your Parents
10. Jerusalem
11. Anthem for Doomed Youth
12. Bonus Track: I Don't Care If It's True
13. Bonus Track: Savages (Acoustic Version)

== Personnel ==
The Indelicates

- Simon Indelicate – vocal, backing vocals, guitar
- Julia Indelicate – vocal, backing vocals, keyboard, piano
- Al Clayton – guitar, cowbell
- Ed Van Beinum – drums
- The Indelicates – bass

Additional musicians and production

- Bastian Eppler – trumpet
- Keith TOTP – tambourine, additional recording/production
- Ed East – producer
- Andrew Kendall – artwork
