= American Demo =

Studio album by The Indelicates
- Released: (United Kingdom) 14 April 2008
- Genre: Dark cabaret Indie rock Indie pop
- Label: Weekender Records

The Indelicates chronology
The Last Significant Statement To Be Made in Rock'n'Roll (2007)	American Demo (2008)	Songs for Swinging Lovers (2010)

Professional ratings
Review scores
Source	Rating
God Is In The TV	5/5 stars
MusicOMH	5/5 stars

American Demo is the debut album by The Indelicates and was released on 14 April 2008.

== Track listing ==
1. New Art for the People (Theme)
2. The Last Significant Statement To Be Made in Rock'n'Roll
3. Our Daughters Will Never Be Free
4. Better to Know
5. Sixteen
6. Julia, We Don't Live in the '60s
7. Stars
8. New Art for the People
9. Unity Mitford
10. If Jeff Buckley Had Lived
11. America
12. Heroin
13. We Hate the Kids
14. Outro
