= Dogs (British band) =

Enalish indie rock band from London

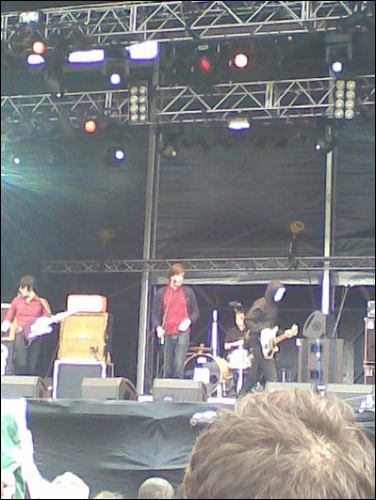
- Dogs performing at T In The Park

Background information
- Origin: London, England
- Genres: Indie rock, post-punk revival
- Years active: 2004–2011
- Labels: Universal, Weekender Records
- Past members: Johnny Cooke; Rikki Mehta; Duncan Timms; Paul Warren; Rich Mitchell; Luciano Vargas; Kevin Iverson
- Website: www.dogsmusic.com

Dogs were an English indie rock band from London. They toured with singer Paul Weller and indie rock band Razorlight. Their first album, Turn Against This Land, released on 19 September 2005, was recorded at Sawmills Studio in Cornwall, produced by John Cornfield. It was released by Island Records and received critical acclaim from the UK press. It contained the singles "London Bridge/End of an Era" (double A-side), "Tuned to a Different Station" and "Selfish Ways", each charting in the UK chart top 40. Dogs returned during 2007, under Weekender Records, with three singles: "Soldier On", followed by "This Stone Is a Bullet" and thirdly "Dirty Little Shop", released on 18 June 2007. The song "Chained to No-One" was released at the end of 2007 as a download-only single.

The band released their second album, Tall Stories from Under the Table on 25 June 2007. On 19 November 2008, it was announced that original drummer, Rich Mitchell had left the band amicably to join the band Chapel Club and a replacement found in Paul Warren. On 18 August 2009, it was announced that rhythm guitarist and backing vocalist, Luciano Vargas, had left the band amicably to pursue a family lifestyle. Luciano's replacement was found in rhythm guitarist Kevin Iverson, previously frontman of the band Springtide Cavalry. Iverson announced in December 2010 that he would be leaving Dogs for personal reasons.

The band released an EP on 14 June 2010, entitled We Are The Dogs, released independently without any label or PR output. Also, in early 2011, Dogs released a free seven track EP through their Facebook page entitled Fly Like Eagles.

On 21 June 2011, lead singer Johnny Cooke announced that the band were separating via a message on their official forum.

On 11 May 2007, a concert was recorded at the Weekender Club in Innsbruck Austria. A double LP + CD of this concert was released on 4 November 2016.

== Band members ==
- Johnny Cooke – vocals
- Rikki Mehta – guitar
- Duncan Timms – bass guitar
- Paul Warren – drums (2008-2011)
- Rich Mitchell – drums (2004–2008)
- Luciano Vargas – guitar and vocals (2004–2009)
- Kevin Iverson – guitar and vocals (2009–2010)

== Discography ==
=== Albums ===
- Turn Against This Land (2005) - UK #87
- Tall Stories from Under the Table (2007) - UK #181

=== Extended plays ===
- We Are The Dogs (2010)

=== Singles ===
From Turn Against This Land

- "London Bridge/End of an Era" (2004) the censored version of London Bridge was featured in fifa 06 2005 featured on the video game FIFA 06)
- "She's Got a Reason" (2005) - UK #36
- "Tuned to a Different Station" (2005) - UK #29 (featured on the video games Burnout Revenge and Burnout Legends)
- "Selfish Ways" (2005) - #45 UK
- "Tarred and Feathered" (2005) - UK #64

From Tall Stories from Under the Table

- "Soldier On" (2006) - UK #149
- "Dirty Little Shop" (2007)
- "This Stone is a Bullet" (2007)
- "Chained to No-One" - Download Only (2007)
