= The Bridport Dagger =

British indie band

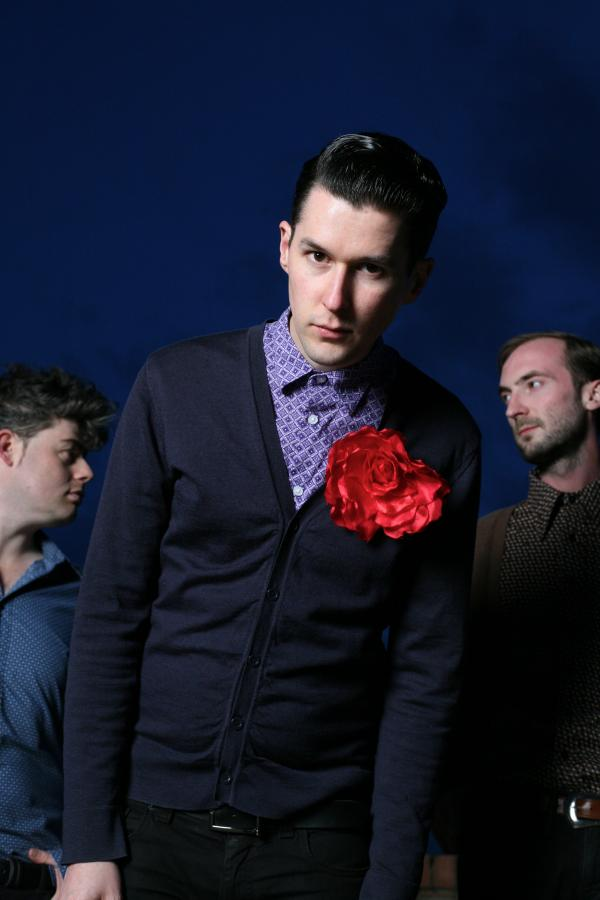
- The Bridport Dagger, left to right: Arran Goodchild, Jason Idnani-Powdrill, Lawrence Rice photo by Nickie Divine www.nickiephoto.com

Background information
- Origin: London, England
- Genres: Indie, rockabilly
- Years active: 2015–present
- Members: Jason Idnani-Powdrill; Arran Goodchild; Lawrence Rice; Chaz Foster
- Website: https://www.facebook.com/pages/Bridport-Dagger/949779085032253

The Bridport Dagger are an English four-piece band from London, England. The band's line-up consists of Jason Idnani-Powdrill (lead vocals, guitar), Lawrence Rice (guitar, vocals) and Arran Goodchild (drums, vocals), Chaz Foster (Bass).

Taking their name from an old gallows term, the band's sound has been described as "short, echo-y blasts of noise. Twangy riffs cutting through dense webs of reverb. 1950's rock & roll as re-imagined by David Lynch."

The Bridport Dagger have previously released a soundtrack album, toured Europe and have recently performed under the Thames for a play with the Crooked Tree Theatre at the Brunel Museum.

== History ==
=== Ausflug Nach Neu-Friedenwald soundtrack ===
In 2015, the band composed a soundtrack for an eight-day immersive theatre project in Berlin based on Twin Peaks. The production was put on by former MEAT, Punchdrunk and Secret Cinema collaborators "The Shells". Beginning with a funeral in the main square on day one, "tourists" visiting the town were able to follow its residents as they fell into denial, confusion and madness, eventually (and literally) tearing down the fabric of the town around them. The soundscapes have now been condensed into this original eight-song album, containing two tracks with vocals and six instrumentals featuring George Cleghorn on sax and Matt Chilton on keyboards. The album was released on 5 October 2015 and was recorded by Nick Howiantz at Brixton Hill Studios.

=== Knife Through Water EP ===
In 2016, the band released the Knife Through Water EP with the Harry Dean Stanton single video, directed by Kirsten Brandt and the "Butcher of Rome video, directed by Chris Nichols.

=== "Wolves" / "Trembling Sky" ===
In late 2017, the band released "Wolves" as a single with "Trembling Sky" as a B-side. It was played on the Gideon Coe Show on BBC Radio 6 Music, and received positive reviews.

== Influences and sound ==
The Bridport Dagger have drawn comparisons from Roy Orbison, Nick Cave, and Elvis Presley while others have felt the band conjure images of film noir and Edgar Allan Poe. The band often use a Wire-like approach to song structure and combine elements of flamenco and fado to achieve a punk ethos.

== Discography ==
=== Releases ===
Year	Title
2015	Ausflug nach Neu-Friedenwald original soundtrack
2016	Knife Through Water
2017	"Wolves"
