= Turn Against This Land =

Studio album by Dogs
- Released: 19 September 2005
- Studio: Sawmills
- Genre: Rock; punk rock
- Length: 43:32
- Label: Island

Dogs chronology
Turn Against This Land (2005)	Tall Stories From Under The Table (2007)

Professional ratings
Review scores
Source	Rating
The Encyclopedia of Popular Music	4/5 stars
The Guardian	2/5 stars
PopMatters	4/10

Turn Against This Land is the debut album from the London-based band Dogs, released in 2005. The song "London Bridge" is on the soundtrack of the 2005 video game FIFA 06.

== Critical reception ==
The Guardian wrote that "at times – especially on 'Tarred and Feathered' – the sentiments being expressed somehow manage to sound more vital than the roughly hewn punk-pop used to express them." PopMatters wrote that "there is nothing new or surprising about Dogs." NME wrote that "if it's bug-eyed reprobates with angry hearts powering aneurysm-inducing buzzsaw pop [that you are seeking], then you've just found your summer's soundtrack." The Encyclopedia of Popular Music praised the album, writing that it lived up to the hype generated by the band's singles and live show.

== Track listing ==
1. "London Bridge" – 3:41
2. "Selfish Ways" – 3:52
3. "Donkey" – 3:32
4. "End of an Era" – 3:48
5. "She's Got a Reason" – 3:26
6. "It's Not Right" – 3:08
7. "Tuned to a Different Station" – 4:07
8. "Tarred and Feathered" – 3:51
9. "Wait" – 3:53
10. "Heading for an Early Grave" – 3:07
11. "Red" – 5:22
12. "Turn Against This Land" – 1:46

== Charts ==
Chart performance for Turn Against This Land
Chart (2005)	Peak position
Scottish Albums (OCC)	86
UK Albums (OCC)	87
