= Subliminal Girls =

- Origin: London, Bournemouth, Guernsey
- Genres: Pop punk
- Label: PopArt
- Members: Jim Rhesus; Nicky Biscuit; Jimmy "2" Shoes; Danny Le Pelly; Arran J Lovechild
- Website: Myspace

Subliminal Girls are a London based pop punk/disco band.

== Biography ==
The band contains ex and current members of The Art Goblins, Rhesus, Ciccone, Video Club, Future and the Boy, Dizzy Moth and The Bridport Dagger. They released singles with Weekender Records, an EP on Pop Art Records and have supported The Bravery, Jamie T, The Rumblestrips, Klaxons, and Babyshambles.

In 2007 the band signed to independent label Weekender records and released a double A-side single with tracks "Burn Koko" and "Mirror".

The band's second single, a double A-side, "Self Obsession is an Art Form" and "Hungry Like the Wolf"—a cover of Duran Duran—reached number 18 in the official Indie Charts in January 2008.

They have worked on a concept single with the British artist, Stuart Semple, on a limited edition of 10 box sets that included special artwork. This box set cost £1410, and is on display at several galleries worldwide. The independent record label, PopArt London, digitally released the single which included the tracks "Self Obsession Is an Art Form", "Posh Girl Names" and "Electronic Hearts" which attracted airplay on BBC Radio 6.

Subliminal Girls went on hiatus in November 2009. They have subsequently reformed for a number of one-off gigs. Recent performances have featured Ciaran McNamee on lead guitar.

Jimmy 2 Shoes rejoined the band in 2013 and since then they have played a handful of gigs.

Rumors have circulated on the internet in early 2018 of a full reunion with new songs. Recent shows have also featured Les "Fruitbat" Carter of Carter USM on rhythm guitar.

Subliminal Girls are recording a new EP "Vanity Project" in November 2018.

== Band members ==
- Jim Rhesus – vocals
- Nicky Biscuit – synthesizer, backing vocals
- Jimmy "2" Shoes – guitar, backing vocals
- Danny Le Pelley – bass, backing vocals
- Arran J Lovechild – drums
- Steven Horry – guitar / production

== Discography ==
- "Burn Koko" / "Mirror" (Weekender Records, 11 June 2007)
- "Hungry Like the Wolf" / "Self Obsession Is an Art Form" / WLTM (Weekender Records, 14 January 2008)
- "Self Obsession Is an Art Form / "Posh Girl Names" / "Electronic Hearts" (PopArt London Records, November 2008)
