= The Lea Shores =

English shoegaze five-piece band

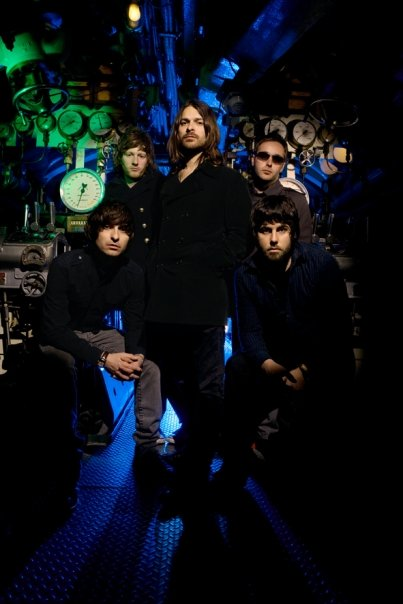
- Press photo taken on board HMS Alliance submarine in Gosport, England.

Background information
- Origin: Peckham, London, England
- Genres: Alternative rock shoegazing space rock
- Years active: 2005–2011
- Label: SE15 Records
- Past members: Simon Webb; Nick Webb; Jamie Smith; Gabriel Lloret; Nick Foot; Nell Catchpole
- Website: Official website

The Lea Shores were a shoegaze five-piece band from Peckham, London, England.

== History ==
The Lea Shores formed in 2005. Their name was taken from a song written by David Crosby for Crosby, Stills, Nash & Young, called "The Lee Shore", which is a nautical term for a sheltered shoreline. The band members liked the idea of a place that can be close to but protected from stormy weather, so they changed Lee to Lea, to make it sound more pastoral and British.

On 2 April 2007, they released their debut EP, "Guillotine" (Weekender Records), containing two tracks – the eponymous "Guillotine" and "Say What You Will".

They released their first album, The Lea Shores, on 1 July 2009, which was produced by Ben Hillier. It was made available digitally, as well as on a limited edition 3x10" white vinyl EP box set, which featured two bonus tracks not available on the download version. The album was marked by a launch gig in London on 3 July 2009, where the band played on HMS President, which was docked at the Victoria Embankment on the River Thames.

The band has supported The Brian Jonestown Massacre (on their European Tour), Kasabian twice (once at The Royal Albert Hall) and The Dandy Warhols in London. They have also played most of the UK's major summer festivals (including Glastonbury, Wireless and Latitude). Andy Bell (formerly of Ride, currently of Oasis) had this to say about the band's live performance: The Lea Shores are my favourite new band… I saw them supporting the Brian Jonestown Massacre in Stockholm and was hooked straight away. The music is psychedelic and layered…distorted guitars and harmonies but underneath it’s almost folk music. They should be big…they're already fucking epic!

== Band members ==
- Simon Webb (vocals)
- Nick Webb (guitars, vocals)
- Jamie Smith (guitars)
- Gabriel Lloret (bass)
- Nick Foot (drums)

== Discography ==
=== LPs ===
- The Lea Shores (2009)

=== EPs ===
- Guillotine (2007)
- Karoline (2011)
