= Look See Proof =

Indie pop-rock band

- Origin: Hitchin/Biggleswade/Huntingdon, England
- Genres: Indie; Pop; Prog rock
- Years active: 2006–2009
- Labels: Weekender Records (Europe), FAEC (Japan)
- Members: Dave Sells; Lee Sells; Jason Slender; Jonny Harry
- Website: http://www.lookseeproof.com

Look See Proof were a five-piece indie pop-rock band from Hertfordshire.

Founded in 2006, Look See Proof played in venues across the UK supporting bands like The Fratellis, The Rifles, Foals, The Dykeenies, Breaks Co-Op, Good Shoes, The Twang, and The Holloways.

High-profile appearances include playing Club NME at KOKO, Glastonbury Festival, Camden Crawl, The Great Escape Festival and Guilfest.

The band released two singles on Tigertrap Records ('Tell Me Tell Me Tell Me'/'Start Again' and 'Discussions'/'Singles The New Together') and were asked to perform live for Steve Lamacq's show on Radio 1 at Maida Vale. First single 'Tell Me Tell Me Tell Me' was awarded "single of the week" on Steve Lamacq's BBC6 Music show and sold out within a week of its release date. The two singles were also played by Fearne Cotton, John Kennedy, Marc Riley, and Chris Moyles.

Third single 'Casualty' was released on Weekender Records, and won Rebel Playlist on Steve Lamacq's show and received a warm reception from NME, with the video directed by Barry Sells (brother of David and Lee) receiving airtime on MTV2.

The fourth single 'Local Hero' was released on Weekender Records, to whom Look See Proof had been signed. The video received air time on MTV2.

The band also played "Casualty" on Lily Allen's talk show, Lily Allen and Friends, after being voted to play by viewers.

Having parted ways with Weekender, Look See Proof finished the year with a successful European tour and returned to the studio to begin demoing for a second album. In the second half of 2008 they enlisted guitar tech Jaime Randall to play tambourine and keyboards.

On 31 July 2009, they played their last gig in Hitchin, Hertfordshire before splitting.

Since splitting, former members and brothers Lee Sells and David Sells have formed a new band called Burial Club which includes 2 new members.

== Discography ==
Local Hero – CD
1. Local Hero
2. Make Me Someone
3. Start Again – Live From The John Peel Stage, Glastonbury 2007
Release: 12 Nov 2007
Label: Weekender Records

Do You Think It's Right? – CD
1. Do You Think It's Right?
2. Don't Say A Word
3. Casualty – Os Darkroom Remix
Release: 24 Mar 2008
Label: Weekender Records

Discussions – CD
1. Discussions
2. Traffic
3. About You Now
Release: 26 May 2008
Label: Weekender Records

Between Here And There – CD
1. You Don't Get It
2. Casualty
3. Obstruction
4. Keeping Mistakes
5. High Horse
6. Standard Class
7. Local Hero
8. Bishopsgate
9. Competition
10. Discussions
11. Do You Think It's Right
12. Start Again
Release: 2 Jun 2008
Label: Weekender Records
