= Weekender Records =

- Founded: 2006
- Founder: Justin Barwick
- Genre: Indie rock
- Country of origin: United Kingdom
- Location: London
- Official website: Official website

Weekender Records was an Artist Management Company and an independent record label, based in London, England, it also had a sister company based in Berlin Germany. The company closed in March 2010 (Germany in 2009).

== History ==
It was established in September 2006. Initially started by Austrian-based club owner Justin Barwick with help from London-based band manager Grant Box and Dymphna Terzoli who had 9 years' experience in the industry including Virgin Records, Mean Fiddler, KOKO. The label took its name from the Weekender Club in Innsbruck where many artists on the label were discovered. Its first year saw the release of an album by DOGS, a multitude of single releases including Eight Legs, The Lea Shores, The Runners, Look See Proof and The Indelicates, many of whom would go on to be album artistes. During the first year the label hosted its own stage at the hugely successful Shoreditch 1234 festival in London. Further releases included Swedish band Shout Out Louds album Our Ill Wills and the debut singles by Official Secrets Act, twee Scottish casio pop band Sugar Crisis and Isolated Atoms. In 2009 Weekender had a change of direction becoming an Artist Management Company affectionately known as WAM (Weekender Artist Management). As of October 2009 there were three artists signed to WAM, The Lines from Wolverhampton, An Experiment on a Bird in the Air Pump from London and also Londoner Sam Beer.

In 2008 and 2009 Weekender UK had its own stage at one of Europes biggest festivals, Frequency in Austria (120,000 people over 3 days). The festival has continued to call the stage Weekender up to the current festival in 2018 (although the festival site moved to St.Polten in Austria) and Justin Barwick was still working for the festival managing the stage until 2016.

Gordon Keen has spent years in the music business. He has played guitar with BMX Bandits, Eugenius, and has supported Nirvana as part of Captain America. Gordon is now based in Scotland where he continues his career as a session musician, was involved in setting up the Gorbals Sound recording complex and has various other media and business interests.

Lesley Olivares continues as an accountant in her hometown of Brighton.

Justin Barwick continues as a director of Weekender Club in Innsbruck and now has a record shop called Downtown Sound, also in Innsbruck. Justin continues to DJ around Europe playing mostly 60's and 70's garage, beat, psych, ska, rock, glam (often as DJ FunkSoulRebel). He is also involved with new projects to release records on vinyl such as the debut single for London band Peter Parker's Rock & Roll Club (Sept 2011), The Hypnotic Eye, Dubstar, Blek Le Roc, John's Children, Boz Boorer (Morrissey), Paul Orwell, Lindsay Murray and MOLLY. He is also a director of Austrian reissue label DIGATONE that releases rare Austrian music from the 60's & 70's.

== Signed artists ==
- 1984
- The Author
- Alfonzo
- The Bishops
- Butterfly Bangs
- The Dash
- The Disciplines
- Dogs
- Eight Legs
- Five! Fast!! Hits!!!
- The Hussy's
- Isolated Atoms
- Kingsize
- The Lea Shores
- The Lines
- Look See Proof
- Naked Lunch
- Nitasha Jackson
- Official Secrets Act
- The People's Revolutionary Choir
- The Puzzle
- The Rocks
- The Runners
- Shout Out Louds
- Subliminal Girls

== Management roster ==
- An Experiment on a Bird in the Air Pump
- The Lines
- Sam Beer
