= The Lines =

British indie rock band (2005–13)

- Origin: Wolverhampton, England
- Genres: Indie rock
- Years active: 2005–2013
- Label: Weekender Records/Amboy Road Records
- Past members: Alex Ohm (Vocals/Guitar); Ryan Edwards (Drums); Chris Titley (Bass Guitar/Melodica); Dean Bate (Lead Guitar); Dave "Paddy" O'Connor (Drums); Danny Pease (Bass Guitar)

The Lines were a four-piece indie rock band from Wolverhampton, West Midlands, England who were signed to Amboy Road Records. Previously had released their debut single on Weekender Records in February 2008.

The Lines formed in 2006 with lifetime school friends Dean Bate and Alex Ohm, who went on to release their debut single 'Domino Effect' on Weekender Records on 25 February 2008. Edwards & Titley left the group in late 2008. The band split up in 2013.

The Lines achieved various support slots between 2006 and 2008 which included The Killers, Editors, The Maccabees, The Twang, The Charlatans, Babyshambles, Jack Peñate, Supergrass, Ian Brown and Good Shoes. They also headlined at Birmingham ArtsFest and the Bang Music Festival at Donington Park, in front of 80,000 people.

On 11 February 2008, the band performed an acoustic version of their debut single during the half-time at the Wolverhampton Wanderers versus Stoke City Championship football match to more than 28,000 people. The Lines staged concerts of their own, including sell-out shows at local Wolverhampton venues Little Civic, Civic Bar and, on 23 February 2008, the 1,200 capacity Wulfrun Hall.

In April 2010 the latest line up of the band signed to Independent Record Label; Amboy Road Records Ltd for the release of their eponymously titled debut album. Released on 11 October 2010, this was supported by a 16 date UK tour including the sold out album launch held at Wolverhampton Wulfrun Hall on 8 October 2010. It was during this tour that the Lines became signed to X-ray Touring, home of artists such as Green Day, Blur and Take That. Shortly after they played at CMJ Music Marathon festival in New York, where they joined the roster of High Road Touring, home to many artists including Kaiser Chiefs, The Maccabees and Paul Weller.

After a short break over the Christmas period, the Lines embarked on a much larger UK tour, including venues such as Glasgow's King Tut's Wah Wah Hut, The Sugar Mill in Stoke and the HMV Institute in Birmingham, leading up to another North American invasion in the form of Canadian Music Week, followed closely by the extremely prestigious SXSW music festival in Austin Texas, playing a number of gigs including the closing festival "The Big One".

They played a summer of urban festivals, including the Camden Crawl, Live at Leeds, Liverpool Sound City and Dot to Dot; support slots with Ash and Ocean Colour Scene; and dates with Peter Doherty on his solo tour.

On Saturday 25 May 2013, The Lines announced they had split up on their official Facebook and Twitter pages. The Twitter announcement stated, "It's been fun but it's time to go. Thank you all for the most brilliant support. Big love to you x"

== Discography ==
=== Singles ===
Year	Title	Chart Position
2008	"Domino Effect"	10
2010	"Glorious Aftermath"	-
2010	"El Matador"	-

=== Albums ===
Year	Title	Chart Position
2010	'The Lines'	-
