= The Last Significant Statement To Be Made in Rock'n'Roll =

EP by The Indelicates
- Released: 12 February 2007
- Recorded: 2006–2007
- Genre: Dark Cabaret; Indie rock Indie pop
- Label: Sad Gnome Records

The Indelicates chronology
The Last Significant Statement To Be Made in Rock'n'Roll (2007)	American Demo (2008)

The Last Significant Statement To Be Made in Rock'n'Roll is the first EP by indie band The Indelicates. It was released on 12 February 2007.

== Track listing ==
1. The Last Significant Statement To Be Made In Rock’n’Roll
2. Sixteen
3. Heroin
4. Unity Mitford (Acoustic)
5. Stars (Live)
6. The Last Significant Remix
