= Hedi Slimane =

French photographer and fashion designer (born 1968)

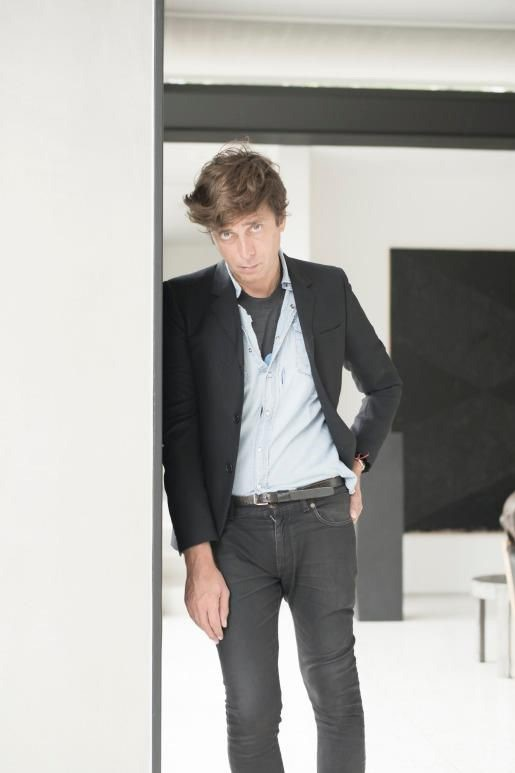
- Slimane in 2015
- Born: 5 July 1968 (age 58); Paris, France
- Education: École du Louvre
- Occupations: Photographer; fashion designer
- Website: hedislimane.com

Hedi Slimane (French pronunciation: [edi sliman]; born 5 July 1968) is a French fashion designer and photographer. From 2000 to 2007, he was the creative director for Dior Homme (the menswear line of Christian Dior). From 2012 to 2016, he was the creative director for Yves Saint Laurent. From 2018 to 2024, Slimane was the creative, artistic and image director of Celine.

== Early life ==
Slimane was born in the 11th arrondissement of Paris and grew up in the 19th arrondissement. His father was Tunisian and an accountant, and his mother was Italian and a seamstress. Two of his uncles were tailors.

In his youth, he and his mother made clothes together: Slimane sketched designs, the two would shop for fabrics and complete fittings, and his mother would cut and sew them. He considered finding a career in the fashion industry although finding it too competitive; instead, he studied political science and pursued a career in journalism. At 11, he discovered photography, received his first camera and learned black and white darkroom printing. He studied art history at the École du Louvre and completed a tailor apprenticeship at a men's designer house.

== Fashion ==
Slimane has no formal training in fashion. Early in his career, he worked for designer José Lévy. From 1992 to 1995, he assisted fashion consultant and press agent Jean-Jacques Picart on the centenary project for the Louis Vuitton monogram canvas.

Picart introduced Slimane to Pierre Bergé, who hired him in 1996 as ready-to-wear director of men's collections at Yves Saint Laurent. Slimane later became artistic director. When he started, there were only a handful of men's designs at the house dating from Saint Laurent's early years. One report describes his designs' sex appeal as "not based on over-the-top embellishment ... rather, it comes from the same honest principles that have always driven fashion: cut, proportion and silhouette."

After the Black Tie collection for autumn-winter 2000–01, which introduced Slimane's signature silhouette and "skinny" aesthetic, he left YSL. He declined an offer of creative directorship at Jil Sander and accepted the position of creative director for menswear at Christian Dior. In June 2001, he oversaw the launch of Dior Homme's first fragrance under his creative control, named Higher. He designed the packaging and worked with Richard Avedon on the advertising campaign. In April 2002, Slimane became the first menswear designer to receive the CFDA award for International Designer. David Bowie, whom Slimane dressed for his tours, presented the award.

Brad Pitt had Slimane create his wedding suit for his marriage to Jennifer Aniston. Although he never designed a womenswear collection, he dressed female celebrities including Madonna and Nicole Kidman during his tenure at Dior. He also created stagewear for groups including the Libertines, Daft Punk, Franz Ferdinand, and the Kills, and artists including Mick Jagger, Beck, and Jack White.

Slimane commissioned original soundtracks for his Dior Homme runway shows from artists including Beck, Readymade FC (Jean-Philippe Verdin), Phoenix, The Rakes, and Razorlight. The track "In the Morning" was composed by Razorlight for the Dior Homme show. Readymade FC composed "F Me" (2001–2002) and "Flexion" (2002–2003). These New Puritans composed "Navigate, Navigate" for the final Dior Homme show in January 2007.

In July 2007, Slimane did not renew his contract at Dior Homme. Discussions about funding Slimane's own label failed. Slimane stated he did not want to lose control of his name and management of his own brand. He returned to fashion and portrait photography.

In March 2011, following John Galliano's dismissal from Dior, Slimane was linked with the creative director position. In March 2012, Yves Saint Laurent and its parent company PPR announced that Slimane would replace Stefano Pilati as creative director. He based his creative studio in Los Angeles rather than the brand's Paris headquarters. In April 2016, Anthony Vaccarello succeeded Slimane as creative director for Yves Saint Laurent.

In January 2018, LVMH announced that Slimane would become creative director at Céline. Under Slimane's direction, the brand dropped the French accent, becoming Celine.

In April 2018, Slimane won more than €8 million in a lawsuit against Kering after he was paid €667,000 instead of €10 million for his non-compete clause.

In January 2019, Slimane presented his first stand-alone menswear show for Celine. In December 2019, he selected TikToker Noen Eubanks as the face of Celine's next line.

In July 2020, Slimane presented his men's spring-summer 2021 collection in a video shot at the Circuit Paul Ricard in France during confinement. Beginning in 2021, he presented his collections outside the official Paris ready-to-wear calendar in short film format, filmed at locations including the Château de Chambord, the Baie des Anges in Nice, the Hôtel de la Marine in Paris, the Wiltern in Los Angeles, the Bibliothèque Nationale de France in Paris, and the Mojave Desert. In April 2021, Slimane presented his fall-winter 2021 women's collection in a video shot at the Château de Vaux-le-Vicomte.

On 26 June 2022, Slimane showed his spring-summer 2023 collection for Celine at the Palais de Tokyo, the same location where he presented his autumn-winter collection for Dior Homme twenty years earlier. Published notes accompanying the show quote him as saying he "wanted to pay tribute to the institution and remember this moment in [his] menswear reform."

In October 2024, he exited Celine.

== Perfumery ==
=== Dior ===
In 2004, while overseeing Dior Homme collections, Slimane created a private collection of colognes. The collection included three colognes: Cologne Blanche, Eau Noire and Bois d'Argent. Slimane designed the bottles and changed the Dior logo typography to uppercase letters. The collection was distributed exclusively through Maison Christian Dior boutiques. These were Dior's first colognes.

In 2005, following the launch of the Collection Privée Christian Dior, Slimane collaborated with perfumer Olivier Polge to create Dior Homme, a fragrance centered on iris. He designed the bottle and directed the advertising campaign.

In 2006, he created Dior Homme Dermo System, a line of six skincare products.

=== Celine ===
In 2019, as artistic director of Celine, Slimane created Celine Haute Parfumerie, a collection of 11 fragrances. Two fragrances, "Rimbaud" and "Bois Dormant", were released later. He opened boutiques dedicated to the Haute Parfumerie collection on Rue Saint-Honoré, at Le Bon Marché in Paris, and at Harrods in London. These were Celine's first perfumes since 1964.

Slimane designed the bottles and created the fragrance names. The names came from a scent journal he kept. The collection is unisex.

In 2021, Slimane launched a line of scented candles.

In April 2024, Slimane created Zouzou, the twelfth fragrance in the Haute Parfumerie collection.

As of 2024, the Haute Parfumerie collection comprised 12 fragrances. Nine are intended for daytime wear (Parade, Saint-Germain-des-Prés, Cologne Française, La Peau Nue, Zouzou, Rimbaud, Bois Dormant and Eau de Californie), while three are designed for evening (Reptile, Black Tie and Nightclubbing).

== Watchmaking ==
In 2004, at Dior, he created the Chiffre Rouge watch, the brand's first automatic watch, which was available in 21 models. The watch's movement was developed by the Zenith manufacture. Dior introduced new versions in 2015 and 2024. The 2024 versions, marking the watch's twentieth anniversary, went on sale in February and included models for both women and men. The watch has an asymmetrical case and red accents. One edition, set with a rainbow of gemstones, was limited to 20 pieces.

== Cosmetics ==
In March 2024, Celine announced the launch of "Celine Beauty", the house's first cosmetics line, under the direction of Slimane. Celine Beauty includes the lipstick "Rouge Triomphe" (released in autumn 2024), the first shade in a collection of fifteen announced in January 2025.

== Art and photography ==
After leaving Yves Saint Laurent, Slimane moved to Berlin. He took up a residency at the Kunst-Werke Institute for Contemporary Art between 2000 and 2002 at the invitation of curator Klaus Biesenbach. Berlin, a selection of black and white photographs, was published by Editions 7L/Steidl in 2002 with Karl Lagerfeld and Steidl. The book documented the Berlin scene. His second book, Stage, was published by Steidl in 2004 and focused on the rock revival and the 2.0 generation. Also in 2004, Slimane created the album cover for Phoenix's album Alphabetical.

London Birth of a Cult, released by Steidl in 2005, documented the daily life of British rock musician Pete Doherty. The book focused on Doherty, the Paddingtons, and the London punk rock scene. Slimane proposed a London-focused issue to the French daily Libération, which was published in May 2005.

In May 2006, Slimane created the photographic blog Hedi Slimane Diary. He created his Rock Diary beginning in 2004 in collaboration with British journalist Alex Needham from NME. He also shot spreads for magazines including French Vogue, VMAN, and Purple.

When Slimane relocated to Los Angeles in 2007, California became the subject of many of his images and later the subject of several exhibitions.

Slimane shot the cover artwork for Lady Gaga's album The Fame Monster, released in 2009.

In 2011, he curated "Myths and Legends of Los Angeles", a group show of Californian artists at Almine Rech Gallery in Paris and Brussels. Artists included John Baldessari, Ed Ruscha, Chris Burden, Sterling Ruby, Mark Hagen, and Patrick Hill. His own work was shown in 2011 at the MOCA, where Slimane presented a photographic installation titled "California Song". The exhibition featured images from his California period and was accompanied by a soundtrack by the musical group No Age. No Age performed at the opening on 11 November 2011. The opening night performance was documented in a film by Slimane and Commonwealth.

For the 2011 debut issue of Garage, a magazine created by Dasha Zhukova, Slimane designed one of three cover versions.

== Bibliography ==
- 2002 – Intermission 1, Charta
- 2003 – Berlin, Steidl/7L
- 2004 – Stage, Steidl/7L
- 2005 – London Birth of A Cult, Steidl/7L
- 2005 – Interzone: The Hedi Slimane Book, Purple Fashion 4
- 2006 – Portrait of A Performer: Courtney Love, a Visionaire bookzine
- 2007 – Costa Da Caparica 1989 exhibition catalogue
- 2008 – Rock Diary, JRP-Ringier
- 2009 – American Youth, DVD Box set, MK2
- 2011 – Anthology of A Decade, JRP-Ringier. (Collection; divided into 4 Books: France, UK, US, DE/RU)

== Exhibitions ==
- 2004 – Berlin at Kunstwerke, Berlin
- 2004 – Berlin at MOMA/PS1, New York
- 2004 – Berlin at Koyanagi Gallery, Tokyo
- 2004 – Stage at Almine Rech Gallery, Paris
- 2005 – Robert Mapplethorpe curated by Hedi Slimane, at Thaddeus Ropac Gallery, Paris
- 2005 – Thank You For The Music group show, Spruth Magers Gallery, Munich
- 2006 – As Tears Go By at Almine Rech Gallery, Paris
- 2006 – I Love My Scene group show curated by Jose Freire, Mary Boone Gallery, New York
- 2006 – Portrait of A Performer at Galerie Gmurzynska, Zurich
- 2007 – Costa Da Caparica at Ellipse Foundation, Lisbon
- 2007 – Sweet Bird of Youth group show curated by Hedi Slimane at Arndt and Partner, Berlin
- 2007 – Young American at Foam Museum, Amsterdam
- 2007 – Perfect Stranger at Almine Rech Gallery, Paris
- 2008 – MUSAC Museum for Contemporary Art, Leon, Spain
- 2011 – Fragments Americana at Almine Rech Gallery, Brussels
- 2011 – California Dreamin, Myths and Legends of Los Angeles group show curated by Hedi Slimane, Almine Rech Gallery, Paris
- 2011 – California Song at MOCA, Los Angeles
- 2014 – SONIC at The Fondation Pierre Bergé – Yves Saint Laurent, Paris
- 2021 – Sun of Sound at Almine Rech Gallery – Shanghai
