= Eight Legs =

Eight Legs are an indie pop punk band from Stratford-upon-Avon. They formed in 2007 when band members Sam Jolly, Jack Wharton, Adam Neal and Jack Garside were just 18/19 years old.

Eight Legs' first self-titled EP was released in 2006 by Blow Up Records. Their first album Searching For The Life was released on 7 April 2008 by Weekender Records. On 22 May 2009, Eight Legs released their second album entitled The Electric Kool-Aid Cuckoo Nest by Ais, Snowhite, and Universal Distribution. Eights Legs also released a third album called Eight Legs on 25 October 2010 by Invisible DJ Records.

Their single, "These Grey Days", was chosen by Hedi Slimane, to be on the original soundtrack of Autumn Winter 2006 Dior Homme Runway fashion show.

They were featured in popular music magazine NME in 2007.

Their single "These Grey Days" featured on the NHS 'Alcohol: Know Your Limits' public information film in 2008.
