= Brontosaurus Chorus =

British musical group

- Origin: London, England
- Genre: Indie pop
- Years active: 2006–2011
- Label: PopArt London
- Past members: Jodie Lowther; Dominic Green; El Stephenson; Shalini Santhakumaran; Steph Fuller; Helen Jackson; Tom Harrison; Rob Britton; Matthew Curtis; Hilary Jackson; Leigh Kimpton; Sven
- Website: myspace.com/brontosauruschorus

Brontosaurus Chorus was a London-based indie pop band. The group was formed by vocalist Jodie Lowther and bassist Dominic Green in 2006.

== History ==
Green had spent the years prior to the band forming as an indie DJ and promoter (for Panic!, Baby Seal and PopArt) whilst playing in a variety of London-based bands (Go Rimbaud, Angels Fight The City, Abdoujaparov, and Circuits) and as a hired hand to friends Metro Corskol, The Violet Pets.

Lowther and Green built the band up to include eight members including co-vocalist and guitarist Matthew Curtis, violinists Shalini Santhakumaran and Steph Fuller, cellist Hilary Jackson, trumpet player El Stephenson and drummer Tom Harrison. Building their live reputation through London in early 2007, Brontosaurus Chorus were invited to play Dublin's Electric Picnic that summer.

In October 2007, Brontosaurus Chorus released their first single on the PopArt London label, a limited edition record split with And What Will Be Left Of Them? Brontosaurus Chorus managed recorded three tracks for their side of the disc. These were "The Myth of Love", "Distortion Pop" and "Kirsten"; the latter a 38-second tribute to Kirsten Dunst). The single rapidly sold out and lead to live appearances throughout the UK in 2008.

They released their debut mini album You’ve Created A Monster on PopArt London Records in March 2009. It gained critical praise from several music blogs and fanzines, but also most notably from Art Rocker magazine ("Seven songs of supreme melodies... A great start for an impressive band".) NME awarded the mini album 8 out of 10.

In March 2009, El Stephenson contributed trumpet parts to Pocketbooks' Flight Paths album, on Ian Watson's How Does It Feel To Be Loved label. The summer of 2009 saw the band cover the song "Because The Night" for the Bruce Springsteen tribute album Play Some Pool, Skip Some School, Act Real Cool, released on the Wiaiwya label.

Around this time Matthew Curtis parted company with the band, to concentrate on his solo project, Typewriter. Brontosaurus Chorus incorporated Rob Britton (formerly of the band Luxembourg) as his replacement.

October saw the release of free download single "Louisiana". The download pack also included a number of remixes by the group's peers, including MJ Hibbett, Zip Boy (an alias of drummer Tom Harrison), Goodbye Lennin, Nathan Jones, Dirty Finger Nails, and Dr. T (formerly of The Violet Pets). On 12 December 2009, another new song titled "Calling Birds" was featured on Maps magazine's online Advent Calendar. A new single "Sandman" was launched with a concert at Bloomsbury Bowling Lanes on the 5 July 2010.

Brontosaurus Chorus' second album on PopArt London Records, Owls, was released in December 2010.

Brontosaurus Chorus played their last gig in May 2011. Green has subsequently formed the Penny Orchids and Desert Falls, and plays drums with the Menaces (featuring Britton on guitar).

== Discography ==
=== Singles ===
- "Myth of Love" / "Distortion Pop" / "Kirsten" - October 2007 (split 7 inch single with And What Will Be left Of Them?)
- "Now We're Making Out" - July 2009 (download only single)
- "Louisiana" - October 2009 (free download single)
- "Sandman" / "Coming Down" - July 2010

=== Albums ===
- You've Created A Monster - March 2009
- Owls - December 2010
