= The Boyfriends (British band) =

UK musical group

- Origin: London, England
- Genre: Indie rock
- Years active: 2003–2006
- Label: Boobytrap Records
- Past members: Martin Wallace; Richard Adderley; David Barnett; Paddy Pulzer
- Website: myspace.com/myboyfriendsback

The Boyfriends were an English indie four-piece musical group from London, England, who consisted of Martin Wallace on vocals, Richard Adderley on guitar, David Barnett on bass and Paddy Pulzer on drums. Adderley and Pulzer had previous played together in Jack. They received press coverage in The Guardian The Independent and the NME which claimed the band was Morrissey's favourite new band.

== Career ==
The band released a split single on 9 August 2004 with The Long Blondes. Boobytrap Records (of Cardiff) saw them playing to a sparse crowd at Glastonbury Festival and offered the band a deal. Their debut single "I Love You" was released in 2005 and they rose to prominence when the NME listed them in the Top 50 essential bands to see. In June, they were the first band ever to play the newly christened John Peel Stage at that year's Glastonbury Festival and had been likened to The Smiths by the British press. This drew interest from Morrissey who, after going to one of their shows, was supposedly so impressed he offered them the supporting slot on his 2006 European tour on the spot.

Two more singles followed in 2006 along with an eponymous album released in October, but The Boyfriends split soon after, following a tour in support of The Divine Comedy. By 2007 their label, Boobytrap Records, had collapsed and the band's website no longer exists. Boobytrap Records boss, Geraint John, implied that the band had split due to poor management in an interview with Playlouder.

Since the split, Adderley, Barnett and Pulzer have also been working on music together. Barnett formed a supergroup of sorts under the name The New Royal Family (featuring Adderley on bass, and present and former members of Gay Dad, Luxembourg, Scarlet's Well and Salad, amongst others). Their song "Anyone Fancy A Chocolate Digestive?" was adopted by podcasts for two football teams, the Vancouver White Caps and East Fife FC. Barnett also joined Luxembourg. Adderley has acted as producer for both bands.

== Discography ==
=== Studio albums ===
- The Boyfriends (2 October 2006, Boobytrap Records)

=== Singles ===
Date	Single	Backed with	Record label	Other details
30 September 2004	"No Tomorrow"	"I Love You"	Filthy Little Angels	Split 7" with The Long Blondes
13 February 2006	"I Love You"	"Remember"	Boobytrap Records	7" only
May 2006	"Adult Acne"	"Tears Before Bedtime"	Boobytrap Records	7" only
September 2006	"Once Upon a Time"	"They Don't Know About Us", "Apathy In The UK"	Boobytrap Records	CD single
