= We Are Scientists discography =

- Studio albums: 8
- Extended plays: 5
- Compilation albums: 1
- Singles: 30
- Other releases: 5

The American band We Are Scientists have released eight studio albums, five EPs, one compilation album and many singles, amongst various other releases.

== Albums ==
=== Studio albums ===
Title	Details	Chart positions								Certifications
Title	Details	US Heat	AUS Hit.	EUR	GER	IRL	SCO	UK	UK Indie	Certifications
With Love and Squalor	Released: October 17, 2005; Label: Virgin	10	20	97	67	—	51	43	15	BPI: Gold
Brain Thrust Mastery	Released: March 17, 2008; Label: EMI	41	20	41	—	58	12	11	—	
Barbara	Released: June 14, 2010; Label: PIAS and Master Swan	21	—	—	—	92	53	46	6	
TV en Français	Released: March 3, 2014; Label: 100% and Dine Alone	38	—	—	—	—	37	36	5	
Helter Seltzer	Released: April 22, 2016; Label: 100%	—	—	—	—	—	47	48	5	
Megaplex	Released: May 4, 2018; Label: 100%	—	—	—	—	—	28	45	5	
Huffy	Released: October 8, 2021; Label: 100%	—	—	—	—	—	11	32	1	
Lobes	Released: January 23, 2023; Label: 100%	—	—	—	—	—	17	—	5	
Qualifying Miles	Released: July 18, 2025; Label: Groenland	—	—	—	—	—	50	78	6	

=== Other albums ===
Title	Details	Chart positions
Title	Details	UK
Safety, Fun, and Learning (In That Order)	Demo album; Released: April 2002; Self-released through Devious Semantics	—
Crap Attack	Compilation album; Released: November 6, 2006; Label: EMI	97
Live in the UK 2008	Live unmixed recordings taken at four different UK shows, made available to purchase shortly after from the merchandise stand.; Recorded and sold at Glasgow Barrowlands – April 12, 2008, Manchester Academy – April 15, 2008, Birmingham Academy – April 18, 2008 and Shepherds Bush Empire – April 24, 2008	—
Live from Union Chapel, London	Live acoustic from Union Chapel, London.; Released: April 14, 2008	—
T.V. en Français, Sous la Mer	Acoustic album; Released: April 20, 2015; Label: 100%	—
Megaplex: Rise of the Lycans	Compilation of B-sides, acoustic takes and demos, expanding on their album Megaplex; Released: April 19, 2019; Label: 100%	—
With Love and Squalor – Live in Woodstock 1969	Acoustic album; Released: December 6, 2019; Label: 100%	—

== EPs ==
Title	Details
Bitchin'	Released: October 2002; Label: Self-released
In Action	Released: October 2003; Label: Checkered Seagull
The Wolf's Hour	Released: December 1, 2004; Label: Self-released
Business Casual EP	Released: October 15, 2013; Label: Dine Alone
Wasabi	Released: April 13, 2019; Split with Art Brut; Label: Dine Alone

== Singles ==
Year	Title	Description	Chart positions				Album
Year	Title	Description	EUR	SCO	UK	UK Indie	Album
2005	"Nobody Move, Nobody Get Hurt"	Released: June 27, 2005; 7-inch vinyl, CD; Label: Virgin Records	—	—	56	—	With Love and Squalor
2005	"Cash Cow"	Released: 2005; Promotional single only; 7-inch vinyl	—	—	—	—	With Love and Squalor
2005	"Textbook Under the Sea"	Released: 2005; Promotional single only; 7-inch vinyl; Label: Virgin Records	—	—	—	—	Non-album promotional single
2005	"The Great Escape"	Released: October 10, 2005; 7-inch vinyl, CD; Label: Virgin Records	—	35	37	—	With Love and Squalor
2006	"It's a Hit"	Released: February 20, 2006; 7-inch vinyl, CD; Label: Virgin Records	96	25	29	—	With Love and Squalor
2006	"Nobody Move, Nobody Get Hurt"	(reissue); Released: May 3, 2006; 7-inch vinyl, CD; Label: Virgin Records	67	17	21	—	With Love and Squalor
2008	"After Hours"	Released: March 3, 2008; 7-inch vinyl, CD; Label: Virgin Records	48	5	15	—	Brain Thrust Mastery
2008	"Chick Lit"	Released: June 9, 2008; 7-inch vinyl, CD; Label: Virgin Records	—	1	37	—	Brain Thrust Mastery
2008	"Impatience"	Released: October 27, 2008; 7-inch vinyl, CD; Label: PIAS Recordings	—	16	148	—	Brain Thrust Mastery
2010	"Rules Don't Stop"	Released: April 5, 2010; 7-inch vinyl, CD, digital; Label: Master Swan	—	—	123	14	Barbara
2010	"Nice Guys"	Released: June 7, 2010; CD, digital; Label: Master Swan	—	—	172	17	Barbara
2010	"Goal! England"	Released: June 10, 2010; 2010 FIFA World Cup for England; Digital; Label: Master Swan	—	—	—	—	Non-album single
2010	"I Don't Bite"	Released: October 11, 2010; CD, digital; Label: PIAS Recordings	—	—	—	—	Barbara
2011	"Washington Parks" (With Ash, originally by Robert Manning)	Released: August 3, 2011; In support of National Multiple Sclerosis Society; Digital only	—	—	—	—	Non-album single
2013	"Something About You"/"Let Me Win"	Released: July 16, 2013; 7-inch vinyl, digital; Label: Master Swan	—	—	—	—	Non-album single
2013	"Return the Favor"	Released: September 20, 2013; Promo CD, digital; Label: Master Swan	—	—	—	—	Business Casual EP
2013	"Dumb Luck"	Released: September 20, 2013; Promo CD, digital; Label: Master Swan	—	—	—	—	Business Casual EP
2014	"Make It Easy"	Released: 2014; Promo CD, digital; Label: Master Swan	—	—	—	—	TV en Français
2014	"Sprinkles"	Released: 2014; Promo only; Label: Master Swan	—	—	—	—	TV en Français
2014	"Distillery"	Released: 2014; Split with Surfer Blood's song "NW Passage"; 7-inch single; Label: Dine Alone Records	—	—	—	—	Non-album single
2016	"Buckle"	Released: March 18, 2016; CD, digital; Label: 100%	—	—	—	—	Helter Seltzer
2016	"Too Late"	Released: April 1, 2016; Promo only	—	—	—	—	Helter Seltzer
2016	"In My Head"	Released: April 15, 2016; Promo only	—	—	—	—	Helter Seltzer
2018	"One In, One Out"	Released: February 5, 2018; Digital only; Grönland Records	—	—	—	—	Megaplex
2018	"Your Light Has Changed"	Released: March 15, 2018; Digital only; 100% Records	—	—	—	—	Megaplex
2018	"Not Another Word"	Released: March 15, 2018; Digital only; 100% Records	—	—	—	—	Megaplex
2018	"Heart Is a Weapon"	Released: May 20, 2018; Digital; 100% Records	—	—	—	—	Megaplex
2018	"No Wait at Five Leaves"/"No Wait at Five Leaves, Under the Sea"	Released: October 9, 2018; Digital only; 100% Records	—	—	—	—	Megaplex
2018	"Heart Is A Weapon" (Mediterranean Vibe) / "Give It Up"	Released: May 20, 2018; 7-inch vinyl; SON Estrella Galicia	—	—	—	—	Non-album single
2019	"Second Acts"	Released: February 15, 2019; Digital only; 100% Records	—	—	—	—	Megaplex: Rise of the Lycans
2019	"Give It Up"	Released: March 15, 2019; Digital only; 100% Records	—	—	—	—	Megaplex: Rise of the Lycans
2020	"I Cut My Own Hair"	Released: May 22, 2020; Digital; 100% Records	—	—	—	—	Huffy
2021	"Handshake Agreement"	Released: August 2021	—	—	—	—	Huffy

== Soundtrack appearances ==
- "Ode to Star L23" appears in the 2007 film I'll Believe You
- "Nobody Move, Nobody Get Hurt" has been featured in:
  - The CSI: NY episode "Stuck On You"
  - An episode of MTV show The Hills
  - A scene in the How I Met Your Mother episode "Belly Full of Turkey" (season 1, episode 9)
- "Inaction" has been featured in:
  - An episode of The O.C.
  - The Greek episode "Hazed and Confused"
  - The video game Pure
- "The Great Escape" has been featured in:
  - A preview for the MTV show Maui Fever
  - The video games Burnout Revenge and Burnout Legends
  - Adverts for Sky Sports
  - A montage of the Best Movie nominees at the 2007 MTV Movie Awards
- "Lousy Reputation" is featured in the video game SSX on Tour
- "Callbacks" is featured in the video games Full Auto 2: Battlelines and True Crime: New York City
- "After Hours" has been featured in:
  - The background of a Sony commercial
  - The movie Nick and Norah's Infinite Playlist, as well as its trailer and official soundtrack
  - The video game Tony Hawk: Ride
- "Rules Don't Stop" is featured in the video games MLB 10: The Show, FIFA 11, and Dirt 3
- "You Should Learn" is featured in the video game Major League Baseball 2K11
