= Impatience (disambiguation) =

Impatience is a lack of patience.

Impatience may also refer to:

- Impatience, an album by Faye Wong, Chinese title: Fuzao
- "Impatience", a song from Brain Thrust Mastery by We Are Scientists
- "Impatience", an episode of Death Note

== See also ==
- Impatiens, a genus of flowers
