= Megaplex (disambiguation) =

A megaplex is a movie theater complex with many screens.

Megaplex may also refer to:

- Megaplex (album), an album by We Are Scientists
- Megaplex (convention), a furry convention held annually in Orlando, Florida
- Megaplex (General Jean Victor Allard Building), a building in Saint-Jean-sur-Richelieu, Quebec
- Megaplex Theatres, a chain of movie theaters in Sandy, Utah
- Virgin Megaplex, a movie theater chain in the United Kingdom
- A Win32 clone of Supaplex, itself a clone of Boulder Dash

== See also ==
- Boston Sports Megaplex, a failed proposal for a sports complex in Boston
