= Textbook (disambiguation) =

A textbook is a manual of instruction or a standard book in any branch of study.

Textbook or Textbooks may also refer to:

- "Textbook", a song by We Are Scientists from the album With Love and Squalor
- "Text Book", a song by Lana Del Rey from the album Blue Banisters
- Text Book (film), an Indian film in Malayalam language
