= Rules Don't Stop =

Single by We Are Scientists

from the album Barbara
- Released: April 5, 2010
- Genre: Indie rock; post-punk revival
- Length: 2:19
- Label: PIAS; Master Swan
- Songwriters: Keith Murray; Chris Cain

We Are Scientists singles chronology
"Impatience" (2008)	"Rules Don't Stop" (2010)	"Nice Guys" (2010)

"Rules Don't Stop" is the first single to be released from We Are Scientists' fourth studio album Barbara. It was released on 5 April 2010 and debuted at number 14 on the UK Indie Chart. The song also features on the video game DiRT 3, FIFA 11, and the PlayStation 3 game MLB 10 The Show.

== Release ==
The Song was released on April 5, 2010 the song was included in Dirt 3 FIFA 11 and MLB 10 The Show

== Music video ==
The music video only shows vocalist/guitarist Keith Murray and bassist Chris Cain, without their new drummer Andy Burrows. They have different coloured backgrounds and are sometimes pictured with boxed heads only showing their mouth region.

== Chart performance ==
"Rules Don't Stop" debuted on the UK Indie Chart at number 14 on 11 April 2010.

Chart (2010)	Peak Position
UK Indie (OCC)	14
