= We Are Scientists =

American indie rock band

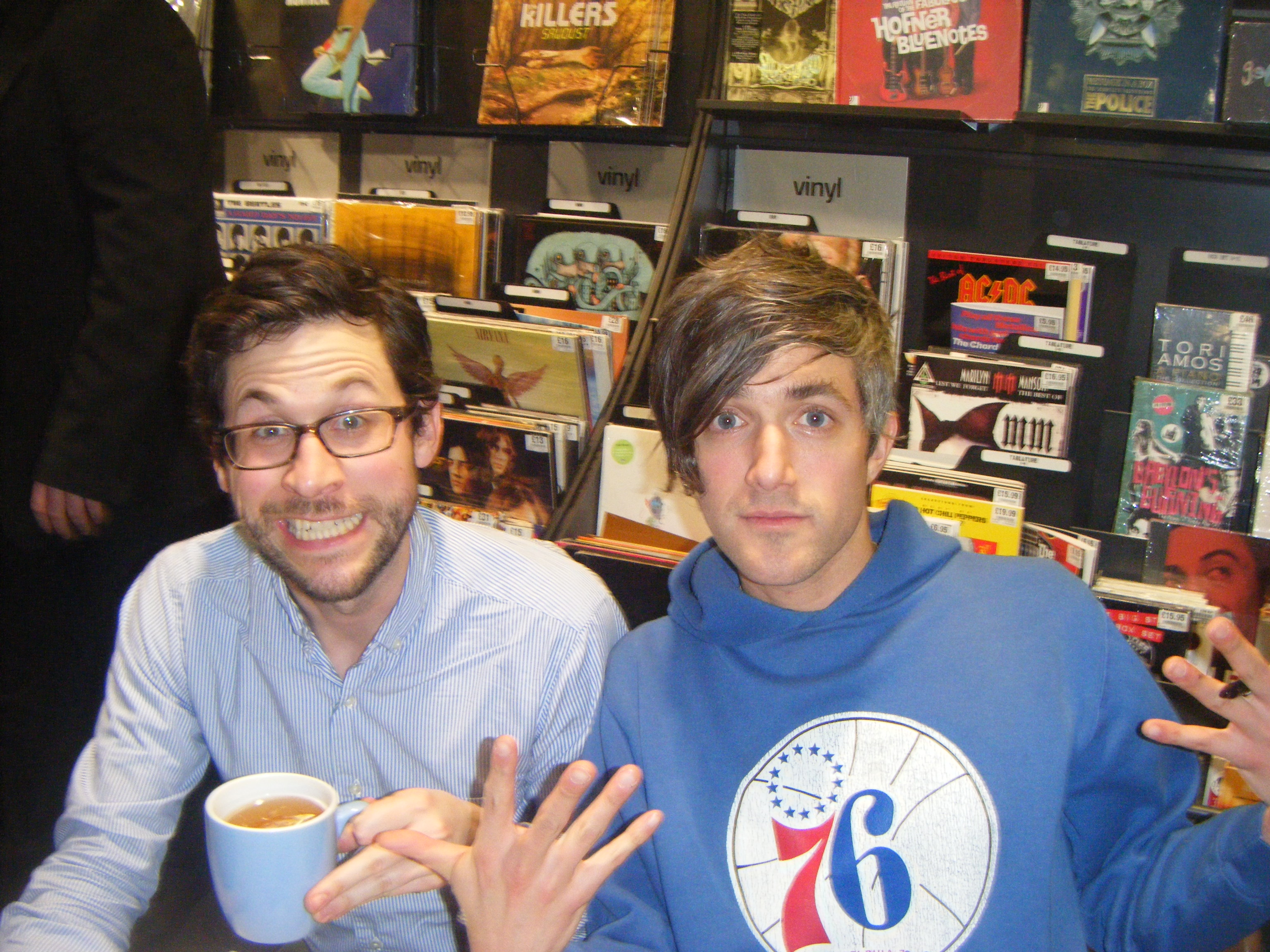
- Chris Cain and Keith Murray in 2008

Background information
- Origin: Berkeley, California, United States
- Genres: Indie rock, post-punk revival, alternative rock
- Years active: 1999–present
- Labels: Masterswan, Devious Semantics, 100% Records, PIAS, EMI, Virgin, Dine Alone, Dew Process, Grönland
- Members: Keith Murray; Chris Cain; Keith Carne
- Past members: Scott Lamb; Michael Tapper; Andy Burrows
- Website: www.wearescientists.com

We Are Scientists is a New York City-based rock band that formed in Berkeley, California, in 1999. It consists primarily of guitarist and vocalist Keith Murray and bass guitarist Chris Cain, with drummer Keith Carne joining the band in the studio and for live performances since 2013.

The band has released eight studio albums, not including their early release Safety, Fun, and Learning (In That Order), which the band has gone on to describe as more of a rough draft, than a proper album. The band's breakthrough success came with their debut studio album, With Love and Squalor, which sold 100,000 copies in the first six months. This was followed by the releases of Brain Thrust Mastery in 2008, Barbara in 2010, TV en Français in 2014, Helter Seltzer in 2016, Megaplex in 2018, Huffy in 2021, Lobes in 2023, and Qualifying Miles in 2025.

As well as music, Murray and Cain are known for their comedy, often injecting humor into their interviews, press-releases and off-the-cuff jokes at their live shows. This has been carried over as part of producing many of their own music video treatments and their 2009 series of television shorts Steve Wants His Money made for MTV, as well as a podcast series titled Dumpster Dive in 2020.

== History ==
=== 1999–2004: Formation and Safety, Fun, and Learning ===
Keith Murray and Chris Cain met in 1997 while attending Pomona College in Claremont, California. Murray had just transferred to Pomona and Cain was holding a Dawson's Creek viewing party and bonded over a mutual love of stand-up comedy, film and television. In late 1999, after graduating and moving to Berkeley, California, they hatched the idea for the band. Murray and Cain, along with their roommate, Scott Lamb, a fellow alum from Pomona College, cofounded the group. Lamb originally played guitar and provided vocals, whilst Cain played bass and Murray played drums as well as handling vocals. The three of them chose the name We Are Scientists, after renting a truck from U-Haul. When they returned it, the inspector, after looking them up and down and assessing their wardrobe, asked if they were scientists. Some publications later claimed their band name to be a reference to a Cap'n Jazz song of the same name, whilst others believing it to be a homage to the Guided by Voices track "I Am a Scientist", both of which the band have unequivocally denied. Touching on the subject in their Dumpster Dive podcast, Cain jested "I can say that pretty unequivocally that if we had known of Cap'n Jazz at the time of naming our band, we would not have named it We Are Scientists." When it came to songwriting, Keith, Scott and Chris' were particularly influenced by films, comic books, with many of their earliest songs about fighting monsters.

Murray and Cain moved to the Los Angeles area in late 2000, without Lamb, recruiting Michael Tapper, whom they had known during their time at Pomona, and who was in his last year at adjoining Harvey Mudd College. Tapper took drums over from Murray, who was the band's vocalist and guitarist, while Cain continued playing bass. Moving again, the band relocated to Brooklyn, New York in 2001 and began recording material in November, 2001. The band finished recording in January 2002, completing 12 tracks - two of which credit former member Scott Lamb. The releases title was announced on March 14, 2002, on the band's official website as Safety, Fun, and Learning (In That Order) for release in April 2002 through the band's own label, Devious Semantics. Due to issues with setting up their own label, it wasn't until June that the band were able to release the record. The summer saw them reunite with original vocalist Scott Lamb. In October after several months of performing in California and New York, amongst other places the band recorded their first EP, available originally only at live shows Bitching! was released on October 14, 2002, and featured 6 tracks. Later Bitching! was made available online on January 16, 2003. In March 2003 the band announced they would be heading to the recording studio with Paolo DeGregorio on April 1 to record a second EP; In Action, which was released through MotherWest records in October 2003, featuring 6 tracks.

A year after recording In Action the band headed once more to the recording studio with Los Angeles-based producer Chris Fudurich, where they recorded rough versions of "The Great Escape", "Scene Is Dead" and "This Means War", which would make up half of the band's final independently released EP The Wolf's Hour, other tracks included "Callbacks Under The Sea", "Inaction" and "Nobody Move, Nobody Gets Hurt". The EP was released on November 26, 2004.

=== 2005–2006: With Love and Squalor and breakthrough success ===
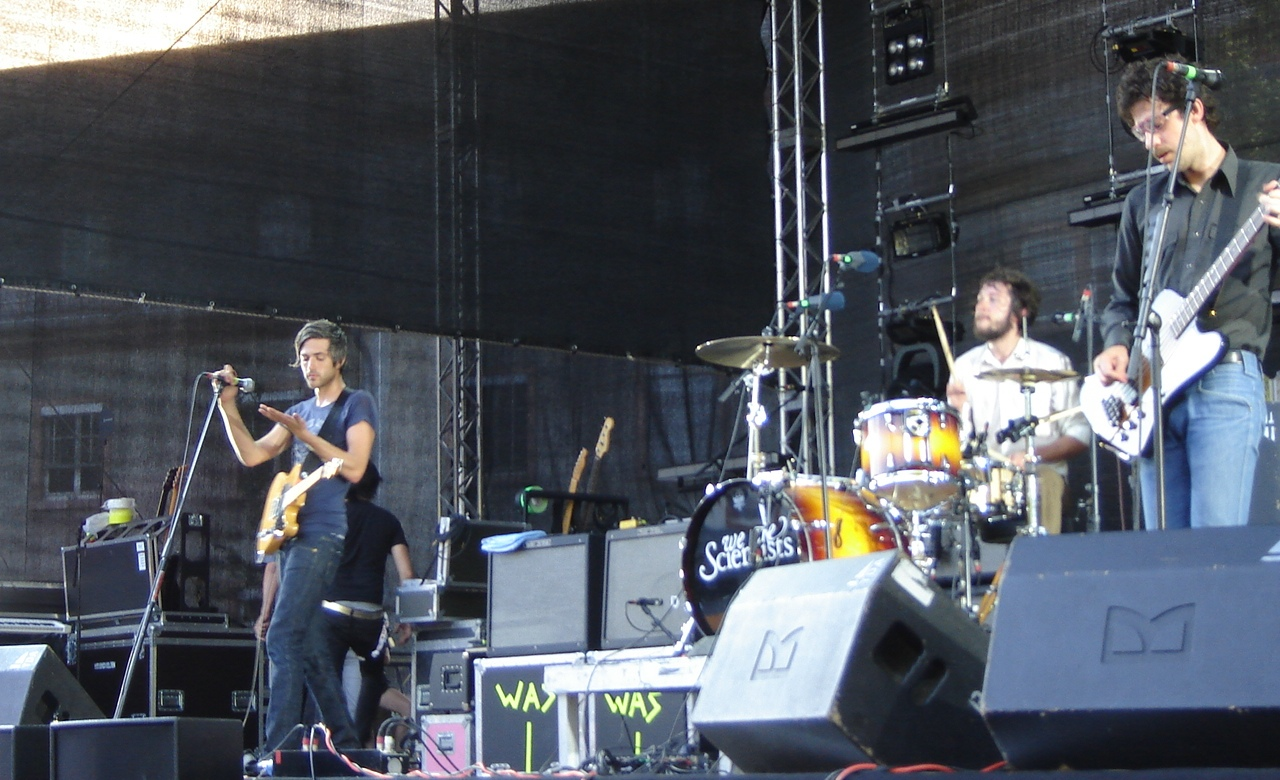
Keith Murray, Chris Cain and Michael Tapper performing live in 2006, Mainz, Germany

On January 11, 2005, the band began the recording of their first, proper full-length album in Los Angeles with Ariel Rechtshaid and engineering from Rob Brill. The band ended their time in the studio on February 23, throughout their time in the studio the band posted blogs on their official website, many of which told of a cat called Lewis, which would later be used on the album's artwork. Having recorded the album, the band decided to sign to Virgin Records to handle the release. On May 15, 2005, the first single from the album was aired in the UK, "Nobody Move, Nobody Get Hurt", this came after a number of dates in the UK with Editors. "Nobody Move, Nobody Get Hurt" was released later on June 27 at the same time as their own headline Summer 2005 UK tour.

In July the band shot a music video for their second single, "The Great Escape", as well as appearing on MTV2 for the first time to plug their upcoming release. The band also appeared on at Reading and Leeds Festivals for the first time, performing on the Carling Stage, and later the band released the album With Love and Squalor in the United Kingdom on October 17, 2005 celebrating with an album signing session and intimate gig in London's Selectdisc on Berwick Street.

In December 2005 the band made their U.S. Network television debut on the Late Show with David Letterman where they performed "Nobody Move, Nobody Get Hurt", as well as announcing the release of their debut album, With Love and Squalor which would be released on January 10, 2006, although in January the band would be in the United Kingdom on the NME Shockwaves Tour with Mystery Jets, Arctic Monkeys and Maxïmo Park, before embarking on their own headline tour in April and releasing "Its a Hit" on February 20 and re-releasing "Nobody Move, Nobody Gets Hurt" on May 3. In September a co-headline tour across the US with Art Brut and a new split single with Art Brut covering W.A.S single "The Great Escape" and in-turn We Are Scientists covering Art Brut's "Bang Bang Rock & Roll". With their ongoing success in the United Kingdom the band embarked on another full 15 date tour, with two nights at Brixton Academy in London due to demand, it was on this tour that the band released Crap Attack, a compilation album of B-sides and covers, as well as a DVD featuring music videos for all of the tracks on With Love and Squalor and live performances.

=== 2007–2008: Departure of Michael Tapper and Brain Thrust Mastery ===
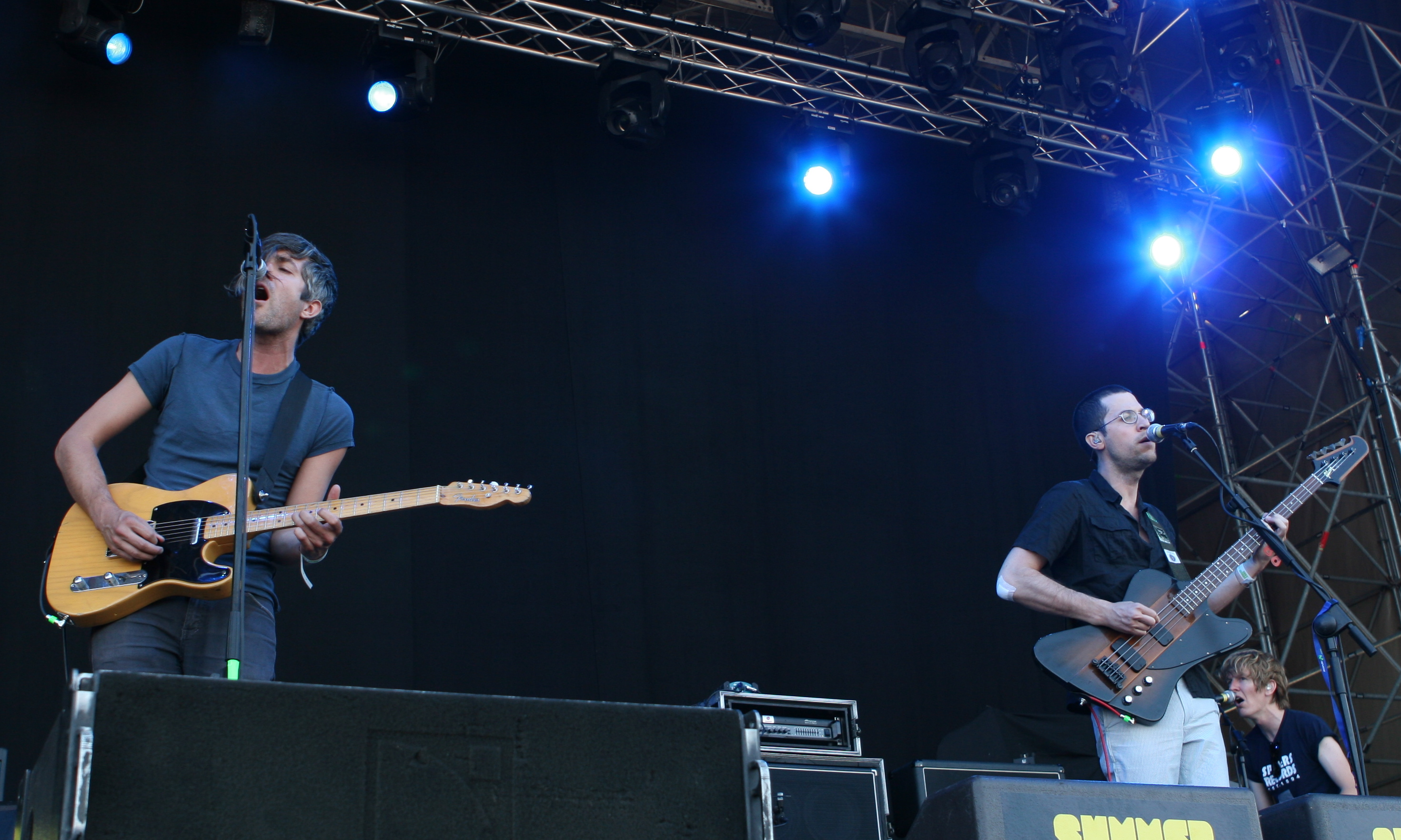
Keith and Chris after the departure of Tapper remained as the only two official members until Andy Burrows joined in 2009.

In January 2007 Murray announced that he had begun working on the band's follow-up to With Love and Squalor in Brooklyn, New York, previewing "Impatience" and "Spoken For" later that month. During a UK tour that February they debuted the songs "Dinosaurs", "Chick Lit" and "Best Behavior". Recording of the new album began on June 11 in California with Ariel Rechtshaid and ended on July 19. That August the band made their second appearance at the Reading and Leeds Festivals, performing on the Radio One Stage.

September 2007 saw the band hire Max Hart as an additional guitarist and keyboard player for live performances. The addition of Hart was to fit the larger arrangements of new material. Days before the tour was due to start, drummer Michael Tapper quit the band. Gary Powell and Adam Aaronson took over from Tapper for the remainder of the tour. For eight of their November tour dates the band acted as their own support act, conducting "self-improvement seminars" under the name Brain Thrust Mastery.

After Virgin merged in 2007, the band were now signed to EMI. Murray stated that the band had to deal with a lot of bureaucracy recording the new album, with EMI unhappy that they were working with producer Ariel Rechtshaid; who at the time was relatively unknown. EMI instead tried setting the band up with various "cheesy, cheesy, big producers who we didn't like at all". Ultimately, against their labels wishes the band did record with Rechtshaid and in March 2008 the band announced that Brain Thrust Mastery would also be the name of their new album. Garrett Ray handled drum duties for the album. The first single from the record, "After Hours", was to be released on March 3 in the UK. The album was previewed a week before its UK release on NME.com. It came out in the United States on May 13.

"Chick Lit" was released as the second single from Brain Thrust Mastery on June 9, coinciding with performances at The Great Escape Festival, Oxegen Festival Glastonbury Festival, T in the Park and Reading and Leeds on the main stage, and a consequent North American tour in July. In the latter part of 2008 the band toured the US as support to Kings of Leon in the USA. "Impatience" was the final single from the album, released on October 27.

=== 2009–2011: Steve Wants His Money TV shorts and Barbara ===
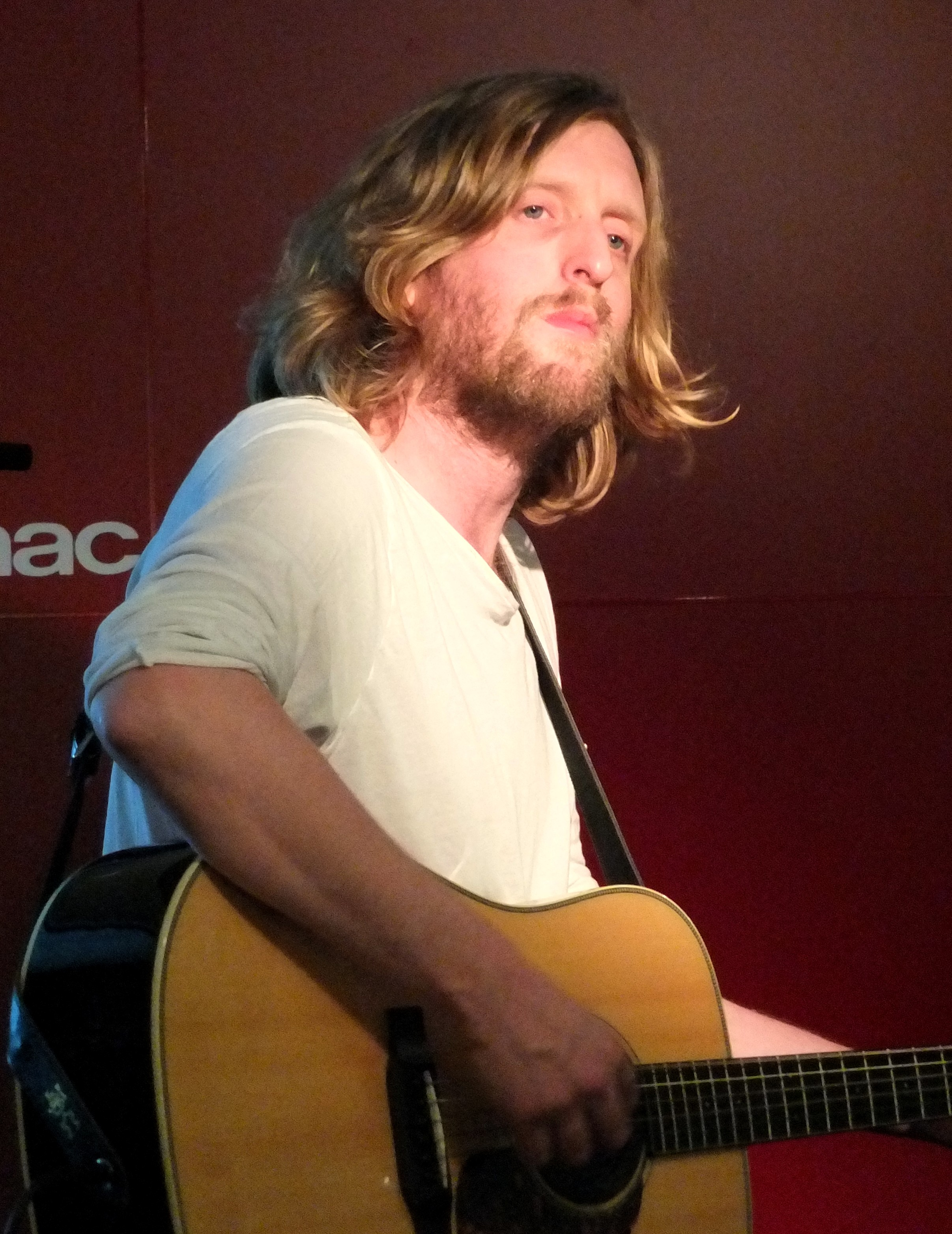
Andy Burrows joined the band for the recording of Barbara and some of the subsequent live shows.

In October 2009, Chris Cain and Keith Murray co-created a short television series for MTV, titled Steve Wants His Money. The series premiered on October 25, 2009, during the Lil MTV was created with MTV production company Ja Digital. The series focuses around We Are Scientists playing fictional versions of themselves, owing an American man, Steve, money and consequently running away to England where they attempt to sell off various marketing ideas to musicians, journalists, music DJs and promoters. The band had hoped to make a second series, however it ultimately did not materialise.

Having worked with a number of different drummers since Michael Tapper's departure in 2007, the band announced that Andy Burrows would be joining them for recording and touring. The band had originally intended on using a succession of drummers on their third album; however after Burrows left his band Razorlight, he became their permanent drummer. In February 2010 they announced that their new record would be titled Barbara and would be released on June 14, 2010. This would also be the first release through the band's own label, Master Swan Recordings, with distribution handled by PIAS Recordings.

Burrows made his live debut with the band at a surprise NME awards show at Camden Barfly on February 21, 2010. Demonstrating the more stripped-back guitar-centric sound of Barbara, the band were now performing predominately as a three-piece, without Max Hart, although Hart amongst other musicians would occasionally feature at live shows for performances of "After Hours". As Burrows was involved in a number of other projects, the band hired Danny Allen to perform and tour with them, with Allen occasionally handling keyboards at shows where Burrows was drumming. The band released their first single from Barbara on April 5, 2010, titled "Rules Don't Stop", which peaked at number 14 in the UK Singles Chart. A second single "Nice Guys" was released on June 7, the week before the release of album Barbara. The band would make appearances at a number of major festivals that summer, including T in the Park, Glastonbury Festival and Reading and Leeds Festivals.

Days after the album release on June 10, 2010, the band released their World Cup Anthem "Goal! England!" in support of the England national team's campaign in the 2010 FIFA World Cup. As well as releasing the single, the band launched their website for the song with videos of the recording.

In August 2010, We Are Scientists and Ash notably co-headlined two show in Australia as well as performing at Splendour in the Grass in Woodford, Queensland. At their two co-headline shows the bands came together to form WASH; performing a number of covers together as an encore set. A year later the two bands came together again to release a cover of a track called "Washington Parks" by Robert Manning. The track was covered to help raise money for Multiple Sclerosis Society. The final single to be taken from Barbara was "I Don't Bite" which was released on October 11, 2010.

=== 2011–2014: Business Casual and TV en Français ===
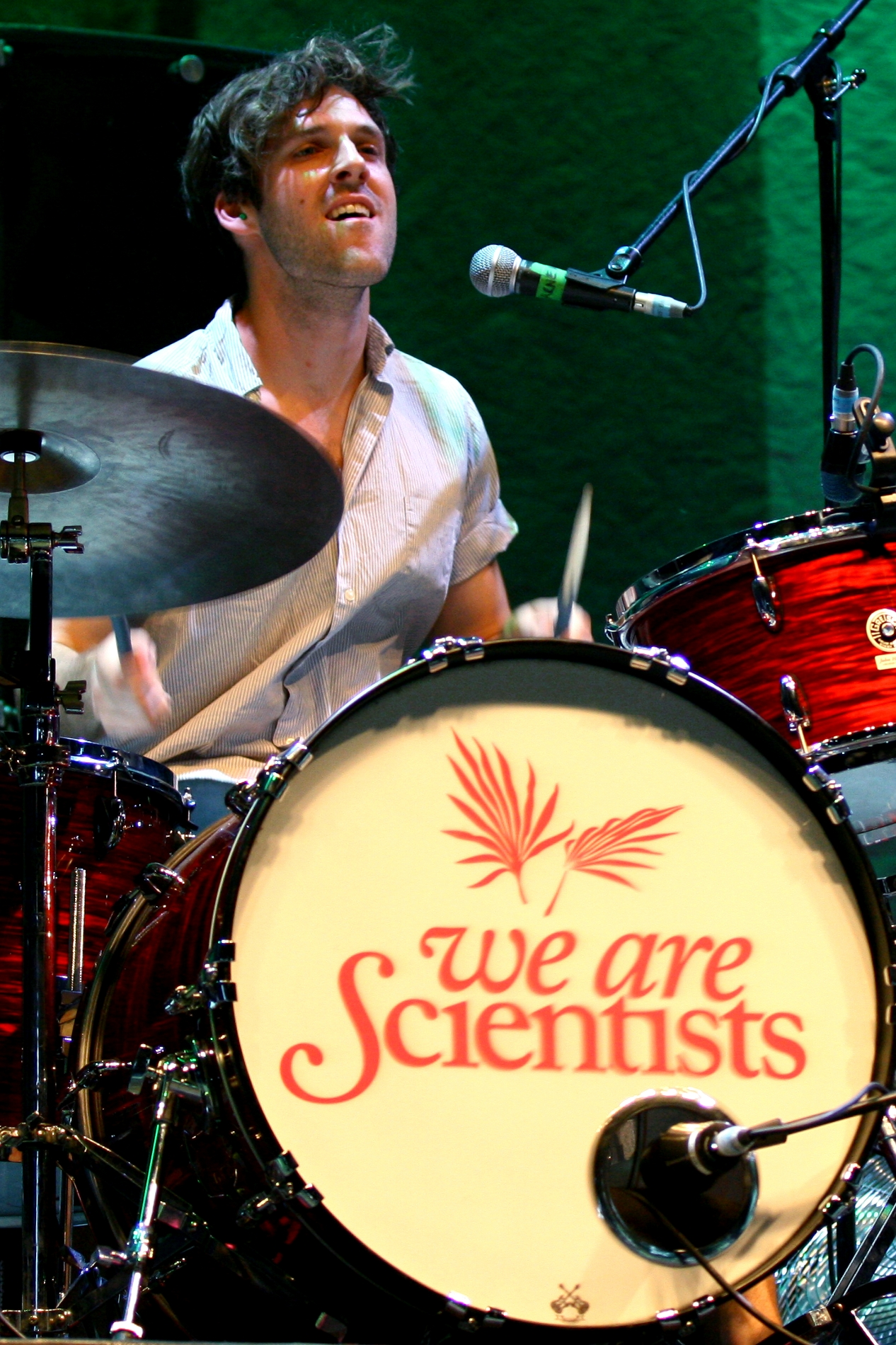
Keith Carne joined the band as their live and studio drummer in 2013.

A new album was first teased by the band at The Isle of Wight Festival 2011, where Murray suggested the band would be recording in Autumn that year. It was in 2012 that the band actually began recording new material, working with producer Chris Coady in New York City, where both Keith Murray & Chris Cain reside. The band worked in a number of New York studios, predominately The Magic Shop, DNA Studio and Ash's home studio Atomic Heart. In December 2012 that drummer Andy Burrows confirmed that they had finished work on their new album, with intent to release in early 2013.

Due to the fact the band had recorded without a record label, and had also fired their management after Barbara, the band then spent a lot of 2013 label shopping and looking for new management. Realising they would be unable to put the album out that year, the band released a two-track single featuring the songs "Something About You" and "Let Me Win". The single was released through their own record label Master Swan Records and Neon Gold Records on July 16. New material was further previewed across a string of UK tour dates in July. Eventually the band signed to release the finished album with 100% Records, putting out a teaser EP titled Business Casual on October 14, 2013. The EP includes lead singles "Return the Favor" and "Dumb Luck" along with album off cut "Good Answer", a demo of new track "Courage" and a cover of Berlin's "Take My Breath Away" - which features occasional scientist Max Hart on pedal-steel guitar. Andy Burrows had recorded drums for the album and subsequent EP and singles, but by the time the band were eventually able to release and tour Burrows was busy with his solo-career. This led to Keith Carne taking over the majority of live commitments, with Burrows stepping in for occasional dates, depending on his availability.

In January 2014, the band announced that the album would finally be released on March 3, 2014, through 100% Records and would be titled TV en Français. Accompanying the album announcement was the music video for new single "Dumb Luck". Soon after the announcement the band revealed another new track titled "Make it Easy", which was made available to download to those who pre-ordered the album.

On February 9, 2014, the band performed "Make It Easy" acoustically on Channel 4's Sunday Brunch. The band appeared for a third time on The Late Show with David Letterman on May 21, 2015, performing single "Make It Easy".

Across the summer, the band performed at Rock Am Ring in Germany, Godiva Festival, T in the Park and Reading and Leeds festival 2014 in the United Kingdom.

In support of their co-headline tour with Surfer Blood, the band recorded a new track titled "Distillery" which would accompany a new Surfer Blood track on a split-single, available at shows on the tour.

As part of Record Store Day 2015 the band would release TV en Français, Sous la Mer through Dine Alone Records. TV en Français, Under the Sea would feature eight reworked tracks from TV en Français, with a stripped back arrangement. The reworked version "Overreacting" was released as a music video on 8 April 2015.

=== 2015–2017: Helter Seltzer ===
On March 18, 2016, the band released their new single "Buckle", announcing that it was the first offering from their upcoming fifth studio album Helter Seltzer. The band had been recording new material with "occasional-scientist" Max Hart, who previously joined the band during the Brian Thrust Mastery era as touring guitarist & keyboard player. The second single, "Too Late", from their upcoming album was released on April 2, 2016, with third single "Classic Love" arriving on April 14, 2016.

The band's fifth studio album, Helter Seltzer, was released on April 22, 2016, and was followed at the end of April, through to May with a tour of the United Kingdom.

On May 6, the band performed "Buckle", "In My Head" and "Too Late" on BT Sport's Football Tonight show. The following month on June 30, 2016, they performed "Buckle" on CBS's The Late Show with Stephen Colbert. In July, the band put out a music video for Helter Seltzer track "In My Head".

=== 2018–2021: Megaplex, Dumpster Dive podcast and Huffy ===
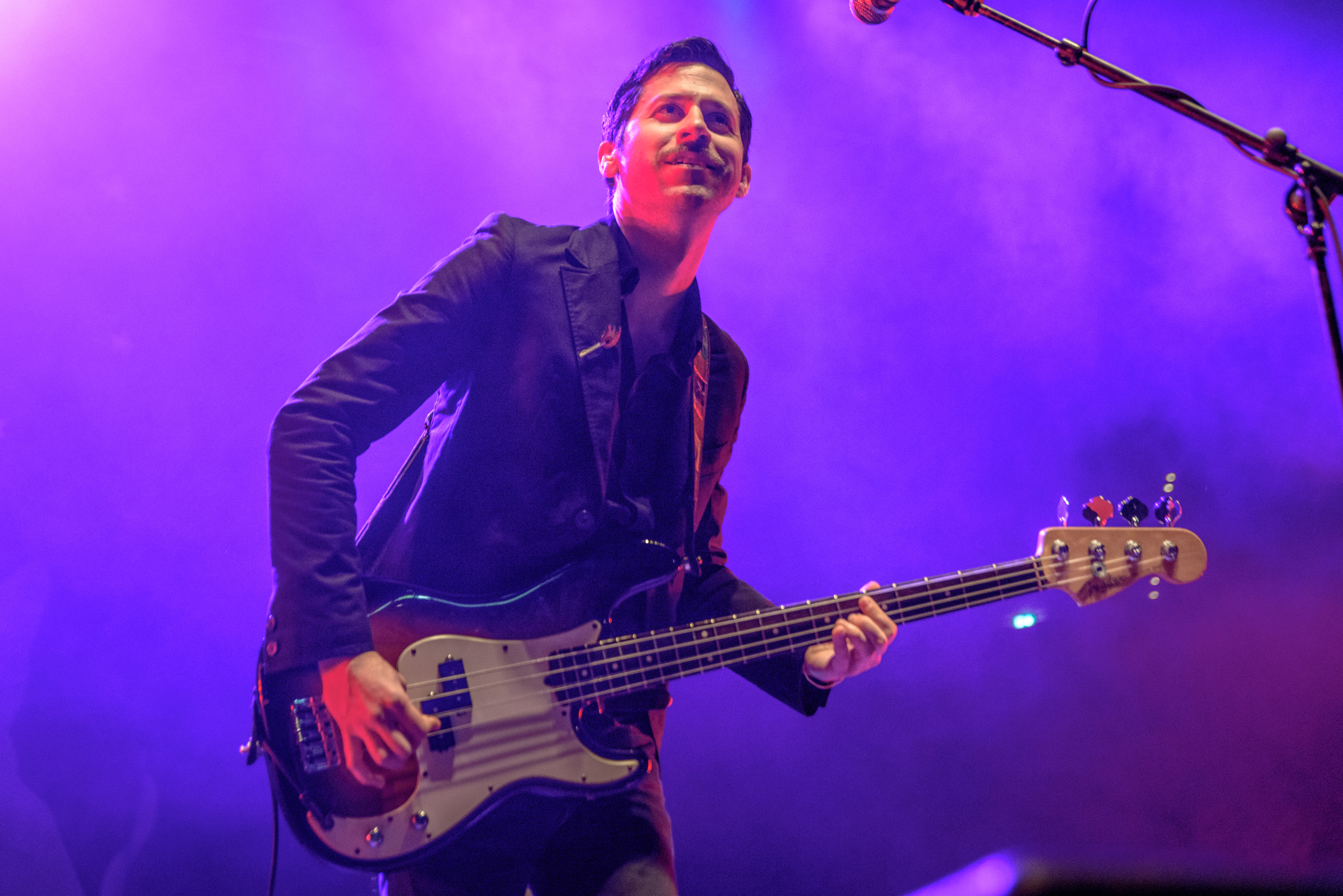
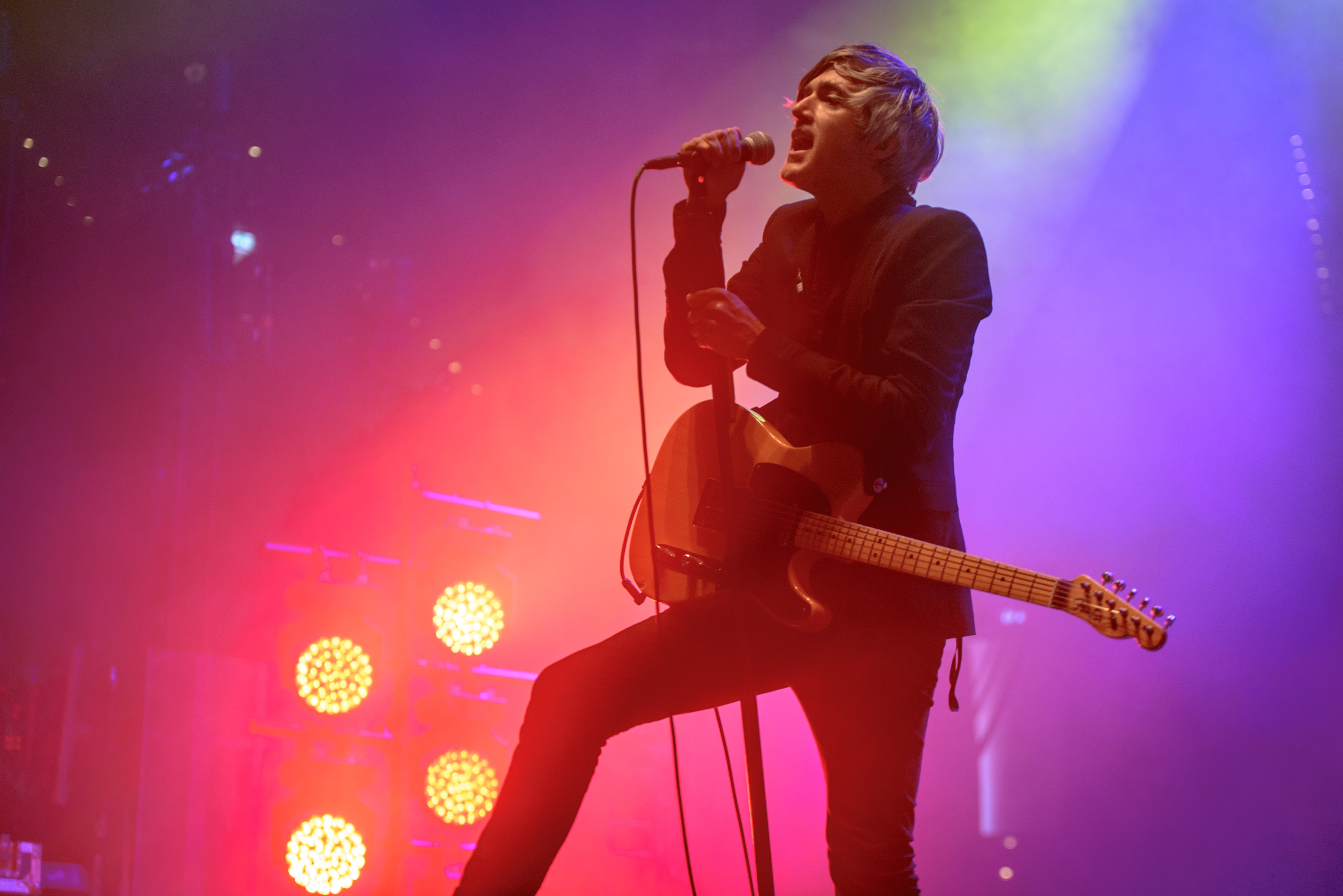
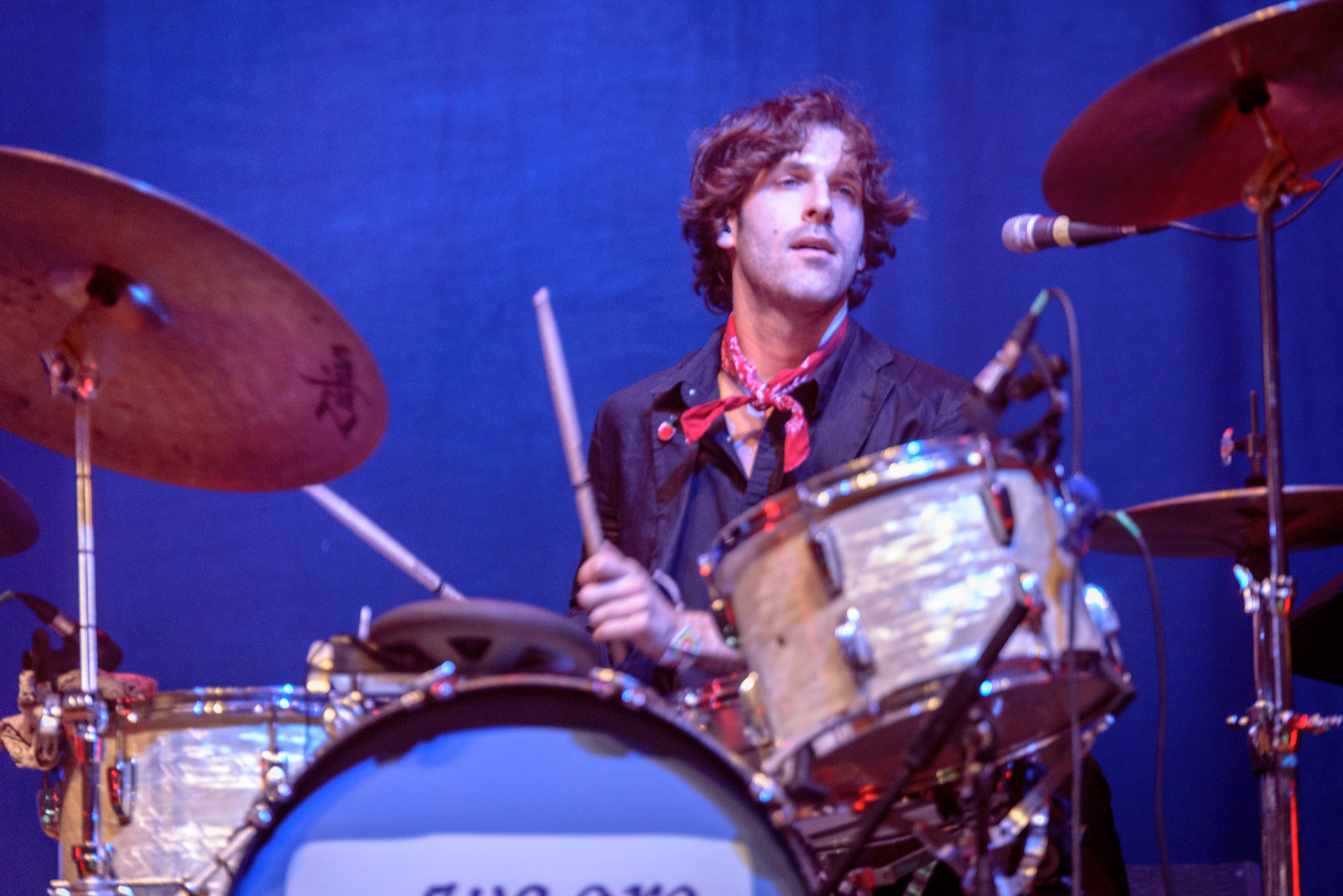
Top to bottom: Chris Cain, Keith Murray and Keith Carne performing in 2016.

On February 5, 2018, the band released the single "One In, One Out". Two more singles from their sixth studio album, Megaplex, were released: "Your Light Has Changed" on 15 March 2018 and "Heart is a Weapon on May 20, 2018. Touring the United Kingdom in promotion of the record took place across March, April and May 2018. Keith and Chris wrote the majority of the album's tracks in sessions for a songwriting club called 'Song Challenge', with Cain describing it as a collective who compete to each write 10 songs in 8 hours and drink beer. The collective also includes Tim Wheeler from Ash, Annie Hart from Au Revoir Simone and MGMT's Simon O'Connor. Megaplex was once again produced by Occasional Scientist Max Heart, and recorded across various sessions in 2017 in New York City.

On February 15, 2019, the band released "Second Acts". A compilation, Megaplex: Rise of the Lycans, a deluxe version of the album Megaplex with new songs and other material was released on 19 April 2019. The release was supported by a tour across the United States supporting Snow Patrol.

For Record Store Day on April 13, 2019, We Are Scientists teamed up with Art Brut to release a mini-album WASABI, featuring We Are Scientists covering two Art Brut songs and vice versa, as well as some unreleased tracks by Art Brut.

The band celebrated the 15th anniversary of debut record With Love and Squalor, reissuing the album on vinyl on 17 October 2019. The reissue was followed by several dates performing the album in its entirety across Europe, in Düsseldorf, Hamburg, Berlin, Munich and Amsterdam, followed by four dates in the United Kingdom in December 2019. The anniversary celebrations continued with the release of an acoustic version of the album titled With Love And Squalor Live In Woodstock 1969 on 6 December 2019.

In March 2020, as lockdown began for the COVID-19 pandemic, the band started a podcast series centred around dissecting their old material, but often spiralling out into random topics, called the Dumpster Dive. During the first months of lockdown, the band also put out regular live streams on Instagram, featuring them discussing all manner of topics and performing their tracks.

On May 21, 2020, We Are Scientists appeared on Jo Whiley's BBC Radio 2 show, premiering their new single "I Cut My Own Hair". While the song was written long before the COVID-19 pandemic, the idea of many people resorting to cutting their own hair made the band feel that the song had a new, different resonance and decided it was a fitting time to release the single. On May 22, they made "I Cut My Own Hair" available to stream and download, as well as releasing some merchandise to accompany the single. The track was also released in conjunction with the Big Buzz Off campaign, part of Mental Health Awareness Week 2020 for the charity Campaign Against Living Miserably.

In July 2021 the band announced their seventh studio album Huffy would be released on October 8, 2021, through 100% Records. The announcement also included their new single "Contact High" and detailed their plans to tour the United Kingdom in November through December then and Europe in April 2022. The band released another single, "Sentimental Education" on October 6, 2021.

Across 2022 the band performed at a number of festivals, including Into the Wild, Y Not Festival and Victorious Festival.

=== 2022–present: Lobes, reissues and Qualifying Miles ===
During writing and recording Huffy, We Are Scientists had also begun work on what would become their next album. On September 21, 2022, the band released "Operator Error", the first single from their new album. Days later the band announced their eighth studio album would be titled Lobes and would be released on January 20, 2023, through 100% Records. The band also gave details of their planned tour of the United Kingdom, which would start in February 2023. The band released their second single "Less from You" on October 28. During the build-up to the release of Lobes, two further singles were released, "Just Lucky to be Here" and "Settled Accounts" were released on December 2, 2022 and January 6, 2023 respectively. The band announced their first North American headline tour since the release of Lobes, which would start in November 2023. Over the summer of 2023, We Are Scientists performed a number of dates across the UK and Europe, including UK festivals Standon Calling, Truck Festival and Kendal Calling.

To celebrate the tenth anniversary of the band's fourth album, TV en Français, a deluxe version of the album was released in June 2024. In May 2024, We Are Scientists announced that they would be embarking on a UK tour in November, where they would perform their second album Brain Thrust Mastery in full. The tour coincided with the deluxe LP reissue of the album. In April 2025, the band announced their ninth album Qualifying Miles for release that July.

== Style and performance ==
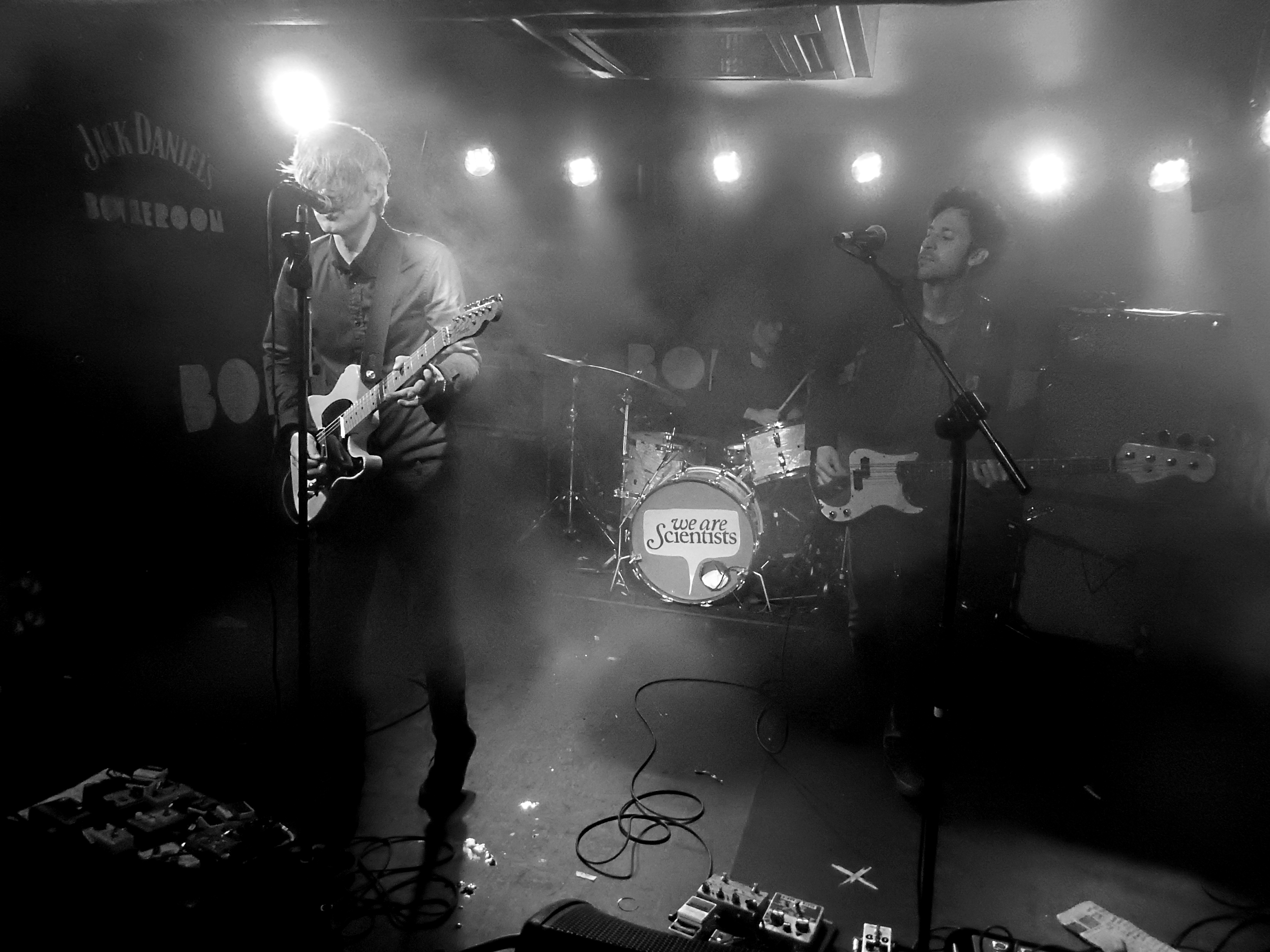
We Are Scientists performing in Guildford, United Kingdom in 2016

Before their debut album, their earliest material often drew inspiration for lyrics from comic books and films, whilst the music drew from more punk influences. The band's debut album With Love and Squalor was heavily influenced by fellow New York bands Yeah Yeah Yeahs, Liars, the Strokes, Interpol, the Rapture, and Les Savy Fav. Murray has stated that Fleetwood Mac, David Bowie, and the Velvet Underground are the band's "fundamental influences."

The band has noted that tracks on With Love and Squalor were largely written to be performed live, whilst Brain Thrust Mastery was a more specifically studio effort.

Murray and Cain are known for incorporating comedy into their live performances, music videos and when giving interviews. British magazine God Is In The TV put forward that Keith Murray and Chris Cain demonstrated "sarcasm and wit not normally found coming from two of our American cousins", going on to put forward that this may have been lost in translation when the band first emerged to prominence in 2005. Writing for The Independent, Ben Walsh wrote "they are incorrigible wags, who are refreshingly willing to riff on any given topic". Their live and interview "banter" is always off-the-cuff, with Murray insisting that the thought of ever rehearsing or reusing material makes him "cringe".

The band come up with the majority of their music video concepts themselves. Earlier in the band's career the band frequently collaborated on music videos and other video content with Akiva Schaffer of The Lonely Island.

== Members ==
Since the departure of Michael Tapper in 2007, We Are Scientists has primarily consisted of Murray and Cain. Drummer Keith Carne has featured since 2013 in the studio, at live shows and in promotions such as music videos. Murray has stated that he and Cain "really consider him a part of the band", going on to joke that "it's the two of us, and then our drummer Keith Carne. That’s the real issue — having another Keith in the band. Too many Keiths." "Honorary Scientist" Max Hart performed guitars and keyboards with the band during their Brian Thrust Mastery era, and has sporadically featured at live shows since then as well as producing their albums Helter Seltzer and Megaplex.

Current members

- Keith Murray – lead vocals, guitars, keyboards (1999–present), drums (1999)
- Chris Cain – bass guitar, backing vocals (1999–present)
- Keith Carne – drums, percussion (2013–present)

Former members

- Scott Lamb – guitar (1999; touring member 2002), lead vocals (1999), backing vocals, keyboards (2002)
- Michael Tapper – drums, percussion, backing vocals (2000–2007)
- Andy Burrows – drums, percussion, keyboards, backing vocals (2009–2014)

Former touring members

- Danny Allen – keyboards, drums (2009–2012)
- Max Hart – guitar, backing vocals, keyboards (2008–2010, 2013)
- Adam Aaronson – drums (2007–2009)

== Discography ==
Studio albums

- With Love and Squalor (2005)
- Brain Thrust Mastery (2008)
- Barbara (2010)
- TV en Français (2014)
- Helter Seltzer (2016)
- Megaplex (2018)
- Huffy (2021)
- Lobes (2023)
- Qualifying Miles (2025)
