= Qualifying Miles =

Studio album by We Are Scientists
- Released: July 18, 2025
- Genre: Rock
- Length: 44:44
- Label: Grönland Records

We Are Scientists chronology
Lobes (2023)	Qualifying Miles (2025)

Singles from Qualifying Miles
- 1. "Please Don't Say It"; 2. "I Could Do Much Worse"; 3. "What You Want Is Gone"

Qualifying Miles is the ninth studio album from the American rock band We Are Scientists. It was released in the UK by the independent record label Grönland Records on July 18, 2025. The album's theme reflects Murray and Cain's desire to explore nostalgia through "loss, memory, and the half-haunting pull of the past". The album's title is a reference to the band's "trials and tribulations as Delta frequent flyers". "Please Don't Say It", "I Could Do Much Worse", and "What You Want Is Gone" were released as singles in advance of the album. A deluxe edition of the album was released on March 27, 2026. It features acoustic and live versions of the album's tracks, in addition to a bonus track "Pine Beetle". The live tracks were recorded at Union Pool, a bar and music venue in Brooklyn, New York.

== Reception ==
In May 2025, "Please Don't Say It" was released as the album's lead single. XS Noise praised the track, saying "with its infectious hook and a splash of melodrama, it captures the wry charm and emotional punch that have long defined the band’s enduring appeal".RTL Today described the single as "confident indie rock that hits all the right nostalgic notes while still feeling fresh".

Courtney Brady of Soundsphere described the album's second single, "I Could Do Much Worse", as "a melancholic power ballad" with "an anthemic chorus" and "propulsive guitar". Brady reflected that the single "marks a rare moment for a band who decided to step away from their trademark high-energy hooks, in favour to lean fully into a minor-key ballad". Chris Bound, writing for Mystic Sons, described "I Could Do Much Worse" as "a rare slow-burn moment" and a "melancholic power ballad built on shimmering guitars, swelling emotion, and a soaring chorus".

Rolling Stone included Qualifying Miles on their July 18, 2025, list of "6 albums you need to hear this week". Rolling Stone described the album as "returning to the skewed and skittish guitar sound that allowed them to become a beloved staple of the noughties" and singled out "Please Don't Say It" as "up there with their best". Rolling Stone said that the album "leans heavily into dancefloor-primed hooks and razor sharp lyrics" and indicates that the band have "plenty left in their tank". Karolina Kratochwil of Regen Magazine wrote that "Qualifying Miles is a thoughtful, well-constructed work" saying that "We Are Scientists delivers a solid piece of modern rock craftsmanship that favors depth over flash". Kratochwil singled out "What You Want Is Gone" as a highlight, writing that the album's "emotional logic is most articulate" on the track.

Stefanie Sanchez of New Noise Magazine awarded the album a perfect score of 5/5 stars, saying "the band continue to defy expectations". Sanchez described it as "a masterpiece album for the masses" delivered "just in time for the 20th anniversary of their seminal debut". Robin Muarry of Clash described the album as a "more mature, often openly emotive iteraction of We Are Scientists". Murray rated the album 7/10, describing the band as "far from finished" and "moving with assurance". Joshua Williams of Buzz rated the album 3/5 stars, singling out "I Could Do Much Worse" and "What You Want Is Gone" as "some of the band's most emotionally intricate work to date". Williams contrasted the album's tone with the band's earlier releases, describing it as "filled with angst and self-loathing rather than the fun indie bangers one might expect".

Ellie Aviles of Mxdwn described the album as "a reflective, emotionally layered record that feels both weathered and quietly hopeful" and a "more introspective turn" than the band's earlier records. Aviles described the album's "stripped-down" production as giving "a live, almost confessional quality, as though we're sitting in the rehearsal room with them". Aviles summarised the album as "one of the most grounded, sincere releases in the band's catalog to date".

== Track listing ==
No.	Title	Length
1.	"A Prelude to What"	5:29
2.	"Starry-Eyed"	3:52
3.	"Dead Letters"	3:49
4.	"The Big One"	2:58
5.	"Please Don't Say It"	3:13
6.	"The Same Mistake"	2:45
7.	"What You Want Is Gone"	3:46
8.	"A Lesson I Never Learned"	2:57
9.	"I Could Do Much Worse"	3:29
10.	"I Already Hate This"	3:39
11.	"At the Mall in My Dreams"	3:38
12.	"Promise Me"	3:02
Total length:		42:42

Deluxe Edition
No.	Title	Length
13.	"A Prelude To What - Acoustic"	4:09
14.	"I Already Hate This - Acoustic"	3:26
15.	"Starry-Eyed - Acoustic"	3:54
16.	"The Same Mistake - Acoustic"	3:08
17.	"Promise Me - Acoustic"	2:55
18.	"Please Don't Say It - Live at Union Pool"	3:11
19.	"I Could Do Much Worse - Live at Union Pool"	3:28
20.	"Dead Letters - Live at Union Pool"	4:02
21.	"The Big One - Live at Union Pool"	2:57
22.	"A Lesson I Never Learned - Live at Union Pool"	3:06
23.	"At The Mall In My Dreams - Live at Union Pool"	3:32
24.	"What You Want Is Gone - Live at Union Pool"	4:11
25.	"Pine Beetle"	2:40
Total length:		87:21

== Personnel ==
- Chris Cain – bass guitar, vocals
- Zeno Pittarelli – cello
- Keith Carne – drums
- Keith Murray – guitar, lead vocals
- Sean Mcverry – keyboards, saxophone
- Katie Tavini – mastering
- Claudius Mittendorfer – mixing
