= Barbara (We Are Scientists album) =

Studio album by We Are Scientists
- Released: June 14, 2010
- Genres: Indie rock, post-punk revival
- Length: 31:50
- Labels: PIAS; Master Swan
- Producer: Ariel Rechtshaid

We Are Scientists chronology
Brain Thrust Mastery (2008)	Barbara (2010)	TV en Français (2014)

Singles from Barbara
- 1. "Rules Don't Stop" Released: April 5, 2010; 2. "Nice Guys" Released: June 7, 2010; 3. "I Don't Bite" Released: October 11, 2010

Barbara is the third studio album by indie rock band We Are Scientists, released (digitally and physically) in the UK on June 14, 2010. The release was supported by singles "Rules Don't Stop," released on April 5, 2010, and "Nice Guys," released June 7, 2010. Following the band's split from EMI/Virgin in November 2009, the record was released by PIAS Recordings in the United Kingdom.

== Background and recording ==
In March 2008, We Are Scientists released its second studio album Brain Thrust Mastery through EMI Records. It was a moderate commercial success, and charted at number eleven on the UK Albums Chart. Some critics dismissed the album as inconsistent and a let down when compared to the band's 2005 debut With Love and Squalor. Dom Gourlay of Drowned in Sound in particular wrote: "Brain Thrust Mastery was a largely forgettable experience ... it reeked of a record overshadowed by record company interference whose ultimate aim was instant payback via radio playlisting and that all-important monster hit". We Are Scientists lead singer Keith Murray said the band had some steep financial obligations at the time, and were advised by management to release another album quickly as to relieve themselves of these obligations. Murray also noted there was in fact some interference from EMI:

It didn't feel like a 'horror story' or anything, and they kind of ultimately let us do what we wanted to, but it just felt like there was bureaucracy. Like they made us try working with other producers, which we kind of half-heartedly did, because we loved our producer. We had put in our contract that they had to let us work with the producer from the first album, Ariel Rechtshaid, who didn't have any real credentials at the time ... they did not want us to do it with him, they did everything they could to get us to work with like these cheesy, cheesy, big producers who we didn't like at all. So it just felt like there was an impediment to our getting the album done, and that was the A&R.

Before recording Brain Thrust Mastery, longtime drummer Michael Tapper left We Are Scientists. For the next few years, the band performed with several interim drummers before settling on Andy Burrows. At the time, Burrows had left his previous band Razorlight, and the two members of We Are Scientists asked him to join the band. Murray said while he and bassist Chris Cain had become great friends through touring, the duo never felt like a true band. According to Murray: "Doing it with Andy it felt like a band again it felt like 3 dudes who wanted to run into a room and be loud, be crazy, and also finish up so we could go to the pub together and hang out and forget everything we had rehearsed. It was definitely rejuvenating to have him".

Murray wrote the majority of the songs on Barbara whilst staying between a rented cottage in Athens, Georgia, and Miami Beach, Florida. Barbara was then recorded at various studios in New York City, Los Angeles and London. Rechtshaid produced the album, while Dana Nielsen and Mike Boden served as the engineers. The recording sessions for Barbara proved difficult for the band members, as they dealt with what Cain described as "a lot of label-juggling, a lot of management juggling".

== Promotion and release ==
Professional ratings
Review scores
Source	Rating
Allmusic	3/5 stars
JustPressPlay	(8/10)
NME	4/5 stars
One Thirty BPM	(62%)

During January 2010, the band played in support of the new album on their "Big Fuckin’ Deal Tour", performing three small shows in Washington, D.C., Philadelphia and New Jersey, with temporary drummer Danny Lee Allen (of Youth Group). The dates were the band's first live performances since appearing at the All Points West Music & Arts Festival on August 2, 2009. In an interview prior to the Washington date, bassist Chris Cain stated "I think May is looking like a fairly solid release time, although we don’t have an actual week yet", as well as describing it poppy and hook-laden. Cain also confirmed that the band had parted with their record label in November 2009, with the record being released by various labels including PIAS Recordings in the United Kingdom. During the performance, the band played new tracks "Jack and Ginger", "I Don't Bite", "Nice Guys" and "Rules Don't Stop".

On February 8, 2010, NME, Gigwise.com and The Fly announced the release of the album in June 2010. "Rules Don't Stop" was announced as the lead single, scheduled for release on April 5, 2010. As well as this, the band performed a sold-out show at London's Hoxton Bar & Grill on February 23, 2010, as part of the NME Awards Shows and to promote the album. Tickets were confirmed to sell out in less than four minutes. The album's first music video is scheduled for shooting during late February. Two live videos (Pittsburgh and Rules Don't Stop) from the Hoxton show were also released as a freebie via the website.

Second single "Nice Guys" was premiered on Zane Lowe's Radio 1 show on April 29. The third single from Barbara was announced on October 11, 2010 to be "I Don't Bite", with pictures posted on Twitter in early August of the band filming the track's music video.

== Track listing ==
All lyrics are written by Keith Murray; all music is composed by We Are Scientists, except "Jack & Ginger" by We Are Scientists and Ariel Rechtshaid.

No.	Title	Length
1.	"Rules Don't Stop"	2:18
2.	"I Don't Bite"	2:48
3.	"Nice Guys"	2:56
4.	"Jack & Ginger"	3:23
5.	"Pittsburgh"	4:27
6.	"Ambition"	3:15
7.	"Break It Up"	2:57
8.	"Foreign Kicks"	4:00
9.	"You Should Learn"	3:04
10.	"Central AC"	2:42

B-Sides

No.	Title	Length
1.	"Goal! England" (standalone free internet download)	2:44
2.	"Down the Hall" (B-side to Rules Don't Stop)	3:24
3.	"Pound for Pound" (iTunes bonus track to Barbara)	2:36
4.	"Rules Don't Stop (Acoustic)" (B-side to Rules Don't Stop)	2:40
5.	"Nice Guys (Acoustic)" (B-side to Nice Guys)	2:58
