= TV en Français =

Studio album by We Are Scientists
- Released: March 3, 2014
- Recorded: 2013
- Genre: Indie rock
- Length: 34:30
- Labels: 100%; Dine Alone
- Producer: Chris Coady

We Are Scientists chronology
Barbara (2010)	TV en Français (2014)	Helter Seltzer (2016)

Singles from TV en Français
- 1. "Return the Favor" Released: October 14, 2013; 2. "Dumb Luck" Released: October 14, 2013; 3. "Make it Easy" Released: January 13, 2014; 4. "Sprinkles" Released: April 24, 2014

TV en Français is the fourth studio album by the indie rock band, We Are Scientists. The album was released on March 3, 2014, through 100% Records and Dine Alone Records. It features guest appearances by Tim Wheeler and Rose Elinor Dougall. The album charted at No. 36 in the UK Albums Chart and No. 5 in the Indie Chart in the week of its release.

== Recording and production ==
A new album was first teased by the band at The Isle of Wight Festival 2011, where Murray suggested the band would be recording in Autumn that year. It was in 2012 that the band actually began recording new material, working with producer Chris Coady in New York City, where both Keith Murray & Chris Cain reside. The band worked in a number of New York studios, predominately The Magic Shop, DNA Studio and Ash's home studio Atomic Heart. In December 2012 that drummer Andy Burrows confirmed that they had finished work on their new album, with intent to release in early 2013.

In January 2014, the band announced that the album would finally be released on March 3, 2014, through 100% Records and would be titled TV en Français. Accompanying the album announcement was the music video for new single "Dumb Luck." Soon after the announcement the band revealed another new track titled "Make it Easy," which was made available to download to those who pre-ordered the album. The band appeared for a third time on The Late Show with David Letterman on May 21, 2015, performing single "Make It Easy."

== Release and promotion ==
Due to the fact the band had recorded without a record label, and had also fired their management after Barbara the band then spent a lot of 2013 label shopping and looking for new management. Realising they would be unable to put the album out that year, the band released a two-track single featuring the songs "Something About You" and "Let Me Win." The single was released through their own record label Master Swan Records and Neon Gold Records on July 16. New material was further previewed across a string of UK tour dates in July. Eventually the band signed to release the finished album with 100% Records, putting out a teaser EP titled Business Casual on October 14, 2013. The EP includes lead singles "Return the Favor" and "Dumb Luck" along with album off cut "Good Answer," a demo of new track "Courage" and a cover of Berlin's "Take My Breath Away" – which features occasional scientist Max Hart on pedal-steel guitar. Andy Burrows had recorded drums for the album and subsequent EP and singles, but by the time the band were eventually able to release and tour, Burrows was busy with his solo career. This led to Keith Carne taking over the majority of live commitments, with Burrows stepping in for occasional dates, depending on his availability.

== Singles ==
"Something About You"/"Let Me Win" was the first material from the album sessions, although the tracks only appear on the bonus disc of the finished album. "Something About You" premiered on July 10, 2013, with "Let Me Win" premiering a week later. The tracks made up a split 7-inch vinyl release through the band's own label Masterswan Records and Neon Gold Records and were released on July 16, 2013.

"Return the Favor" was first premiered on September 20, 2013, in a music video directed by their frequent collaborator, Dan Monick. The track would feature as part of an EP release, titled Business Casual released before the album on October 14, 2013.

"Dumb Luck" premiered on October 7, 2013, through Clash before its release as part of the Business Casual EP on October 14. The music video premiered later on January 13, 2014, and was directed by Noah Conopask.

"Make it Easy" was released as a single January 13, 2014, through digital music stores, and additionally made available to anyone who preordered the album. The music video premiered on May 20, 2014, and was directed by Melissa Tomjanovich. Tim Wheeler and We Are Scientists drummers Keith Carne and Danny Allen all feature as the videos masked aliens. The following day the band made a third appearance on The Late Show with David Letterman performing the track.

A music video for "Sprinkles" was premiered through Stereogum on April 24, 2014. The video was directed by James Perou.

== Critical reception ==
Professional ratings
Review scores
Source	Rating
Alternative Press	3.5/5 stars

At Alternative Press, Jason Schreurs rated the album three-and-a-half stars out of five, saying that "With some pop, college rock, post-punk and even shoegaze thrown in for good measure, TV En Francais is the most complete We Are Scientists record."

The album entered the UK Chart at No. 36.

== Track listing ==
All music is composed by We Are Scientists.

No.	Title	Length
1.	"What You Do Best"	3:21
2.	"Dumb Luck"	3:14
3.	"Make It Easy"	4:29
4.	"Sprinkles"	3:47
5.	"Courage"	2:28
6.	"Overreacting"	3:36
7.	"Return the Favor"	3:14
8.	"Slow Down"	3:25
9.	"Don't Blow It"	3:54
10.	"Take an Arrow"	3:39
Total length:		34:30

Bonus disk
No.	Title	Length
1.	"Something About You"	3:20
2.	"Let Me Win"	4:52
3.	"Good Answer"	3:41
4.	"Take My Breath Away"	5:30

== Personnel ==
We Are Scientists

- Keith Murray – acoustic and electric guitars, keyboards, vocals and whistle
- Chris Cain – bass, synth, vocals
- Andy Burrows – drums, percussion, keyboards, vocals and whistle

Session musicians

- Chris Coady – keyboards, percussion and whistle
- Tim Wheeler – vocals
- Anthony Rossomando – vocals
- Rose Elinor Dougall – vocals

Technical personnel

- Chris Coady – production
- Tim Wheeler – engineering
- Claudius Mittendorfer – engineering
- James Brown – mixing
- Kevin Matela – assistant mixing
- Joe LaPorta – mastering

Design

- Dan Monick - art direction/photography
- Dylan Haley - art direction/package design
