= Crap Attack =

Compilation album by We Are Scientists
- Released: November 6, 2006
- Genre: Alternative rock
- Label: EMI

We Are Scientists chronology
| With Love and Squalor (2005) | Crap Attack (2006) | Brain Thrust Mastery (2008) |

Crap Attack is compilation album by American rock band We Are Scientists, released on November 6, 2006 in the UK. The album is a compilation of b-sides and rarities. It contains covers of "Hoppípolla" by Icelandic band Sigur Rós, "Bang Bang Rock & Roll" by British band Art Brut, "Be My Baby" by 1960s girl group The Ronettes and "Sie hat was vermisst" by Bela B. and remixes of their own songs from With Love and Squalor.

The album also contains a DVD with a video to every song on the album. It also contains a live show which was filmed at Shepherd's Bush Empire on 13 April 2006 in London, as well as two promotional adverts for With Love and Squalor.

== Track listing ==
| No. | Title | Length |
|---|---|---|
| 1. | "Ram It Home" | 3:18 |
| 2. | "Surprise" | 2:36 |
| 3. | "The Great Escape (The Silence Mix)" | 5:43 |
| 4. | "Mucho Más" | 2:47 |
| 5. | "Callbacks Under The Sea" | 2:58 |
| 6. | "Hoppípolla" (Sigur Rós cover) | 4:06 |
| 7. | "Bang Bang Rock & Roll" (Art Brut cover) | 4:25 |
| 8. | "Nobody Move, Nobody Get Hurt Under the Sea" | 3:56 |
| 9. | "Sie hat was vermisst" (Bela B. cover) | 5:51 |
| 10. | "Be My Baby" (The Ronettes cover) | 3:12 |
| 11. | "This Scene is Dead (Pete Predictable Remix)" | 5:05 |
| 12. | "History Repeats" | 3:57 |
| 13. | "This Means War" | 3:28 |
| 14. | "The Great Escape Under the Sea" | 3:55 |
| 15. | "Textbook Under the Sea" | 3:23 |
| Total length: | | 58:40 |

Notes

- Under The Sea versions are acoustic versions
