= After Hours (We Are Scientists song) =

Single by We Are Scientists

from the album Brain Thrust Mastery
- Released: 3 March 2008
- Recorded: 2007
- Genre: Indie rock
- Length: 3:49
- Label: Virgin
- Songwriters: Chris Cain; Keith Murray

We Are Scientists singles chronology
"Nobody Move, Nobody Get Hurt" (2006)	"After Hours" (2008)	"Chick Lit" (2008)

"After Hours" is the first single from We Are Scientists's album Brain Thrust Mastery, released on CD and 7-inch vinyl on March 3, 2008. The music video for the track features actress Katrina Bowden and was directed by Akiva Schaffer. The song made it to number 15 on the UK singles chart, making it their highest charting single to date.

"After Hours" was featured in the 2008 film Nick and Norah's Infinite Playlist, as well as in trailers.

It was also featured in the video game Tony Hawk: Ride.

== Track listing ==
- 7" #1
1. "After Hours"
2. "Dig Dug"
- 7" #2 (Picture Disc)
1. "After Hours"
- CD
1. "After Hours"
2. "Best Behaviour"

== Music video ==
The music video, which now has nearly 2,800,000 views, features a double date. A man, played by Chris Cain, believes that he is being set up with a friend of Keith Murray, only to find out that the friend is a dog. The video also features actress Katrina Bowden.
