= Nice Guys (song) =

Single by We Are Scientists

from the album Barbara
- B-side: "–"
- Released: June 7, 2010
- Recorded: 2009
- Genre: Indie rock
- Length: 2:56
- Label: Masterswan
- Songwriters: Chris Cain, Keith Murray

We Are Scientists singles chronology
"Rules Don't Stop" (2010)	"Nice Guys" (2010)	"I Don't Bite" (2010)

"Nice Guys" is the second single from We Are Scientists' album Barbara. The single was released on 7 June 2010, the week before Barbara and debuted at number 17 on the UK Indie Chart.

== Release ==
The track was premiered on Zane Lowe's BBC Radio 1 show on April 29, and made his Hottest Record soon after. The single's artwork features dolls of the band - (L-R) Andy, Keith, and Chris. The dolls were created by Adrian Stone, a fan of the band.

== Chart performance ==
"Nice Guys" debuted on the UK Indie Chart at number 17 on 13 June 2010.

Chart (2010)	Peak position
UK Indie (Official Charts)	17
