= Huffy (album) =

Studio album by We Are Scientists
- Released: October 8, 2021
- Studio: Atomic Heart Studio (New York); Malpractice Suites (New York); The Court Room (New York)
- Genre: Indie rock
- Length: 33:57
- Label: 100%
- Producer: We Are Scientists

We Are Scientists chronology
Megaplex (2018)	Huffy (2021)	Lobes (2023)

Singles from Huffy
- 1. "I Cut My Own Hair" Released: May 22, 2020; 2. "Fault Lines" Released: November 20, 2020; 3. "Contact High" Released: July 1, 2021; 4. "You've Lost Your Shit" Released: September 9, 2021; 5. "Sentimental Education" Released: October 6, 2021

Professional ratings
Review scores
Source	Rating
AllMusic	4/5 stars
Clash	8/10
Gigwise	6/10 stars

Huffy is the seventh studio album by American indie rock band We Are Scientists. It was released on October 8, 2021, by 100% Records.

== Track listing ==
All tracks are written by Keith Murray and Chris Cain.

No.	Title	Length
1.	"You've Lost Your Shit"	2:59
2.	"Contact High"	3:29
3.	"Handshake Agreement"	3:28
4.	"I Cut My Own Hair"	2:32
5.	"Just Education"	3:47
6.	"Sentimental Education"	3:39
7.	"Fault Lines"	2:42
8.	"Pandemonium"	3:11
9.	"Bought Myself a Grave"	4:07
10.	"Behaviour Unbecoming"	4:03
Total length:		33:57
