= Helter Seltzer =

Studio album by We Are Scientists
- Released: April 22, 2016
- Recorded: 2015–2016
- Studios: Clockwork Studios, Downtown Music Studios (New York City); Fivestar Studios (Los Angeles); The Turd Factory
- Genre: Indie rock
- Length: 33:44
- Label: 100%
- Producer: Max Hart

We Are Scientists chronology
TV en Français (2014)	Helter Seltzer (2016)	Megaplex (2018)

Singles from Helter Seltzer
- 1. "Buckle" Released: March 18, 2016; 2. "Too Late" Released: April 1, 2016; 3. "Classic Love" Released: April 15, 2016

Helter Seltzer is the fifth studio album by American indie rock band We Are Scientists. It was released on April 22, 2016, by 100% Records.

== Promotion ==
=== Singles ===
"Buckle" was released on March 18, 2016, as the album's lead single. The album's second single, "Too Late", was released on April 1, 2016. The third single, "Classic Love", was released on April 15, 2016.

=== Promotional singles ===
The album's track "Headlights" was premiered through Clash on April 20, 2016.

=== Performances ===
The band appeared on The Late Show with Stephen Colbert on June 30, 2016, performing "Buckle".

Professional ratings
Aggregate scores
Source	Rating
Metacritic	73/100
Review scores
Source	Rating
Allmusic	4/5 stars
PopMatters	(6/10)
Evening Standard	(4/5)

== Track listing ==
All tracks are written by We Are Scientists.

No.	Title	Length
1.	"Buckle"	2:58
2.	"In My Head"	3:22
3.	"Too Late"	3:13
4.	"Hold On"	3:20
5.	"We Need a Word"	4:29
6.	"Want for Nothing"	3:44
7.	"Classic Love"	2:36
8.	"Waiting for You"	4:05
9.	"Headlights"	2:33
10.	"Forgiveness"	3:24
Total length:		33:44

== Charts ==
Chart (2016)	Peak position
Scottish Albums (Official Charts)	47
UK Albums (Official Charts)	48
UK Independent Albums (Official Charts)	5
