= Lobes (album) =

Studio album by We Are Scientists
- Released: January 20, 2023
- Genre: Dance-rock
- Length: 36:47
- Label: 100%
- Producer: Chris Cain; Keith Murray

We Are Scientists chronology
Huffy (2021)	Lobes (2023)	Qualifying Miles (2025)

Singles from Lobes
- 1. "Operator Error" Released: September 21, 2022; 2. "Less From You" Released: October 28, 2022; 3. "Lucky Just to Be Here" Released: December 2, 2022

Professional ratings
Aggregate scores
Source	Rating
Metacritic	71/100
Review scores
Source	Rating
Clash	7/10
Pitchfork	6.0/10
PopMatters	8/10

Lobes is the eighth studio album by American indie rock band We Are Scientists. It was released on January 20, 2023, by 100% Records.

Talking about the album, Keith Murray confirmed in an interview with Recordspin that "the more rock ‘n’ roll songs ended up on Huffy and the handful of synth-heavy dance songs that we had, ended up being the basis of Lobes".

== Track listing ==
All tracks are written by Keith Murray and Chris Cain.

Lobes track listing
No.	Title	Length
1.	"Operator Error"	2:36
2.	"Dispense with Sentiment"	3:30
3.	"Human Resources"	3:59
4.	"Lucky Just to Be Here"	4:51
5.	"Turn It Up"	3:57
6.	"Settled Accounts"	3:41
7.	"Here Goes"	2:54
8.	"Parachute"	3:42
9.	"Less from You"	3:42
10.	"Miracle of '22"	3:52
Total length:		36:47

== Personnel ==
=== We Are Scientists ===
- Chris Cain – bass guitar, production
- Keith Murray – vocals, production

=== Additional contributors ===
- Keith Carne – drums, engineering assistance
- Katie Tavini – mastering
- Claudius Mittendorfer – mixing
- Tim Wheeler – engineering assistance
- Kyler O'Neal – artwork
- Dylan Haley – design assistance
