= Safety, Fun, and Learning (In That Order) =

Demo album by We Are Scientists
- Released: April 2002
- Recorded: 2001–2002
- Genre: Indie rock, dance-punk
- Length: 36:55
- Label: Devious Semantics

We Are Scientists chronology
Safety, Fun, and Learning (In That Order) (2002)	With Love and Squalor (2005)

Safety, Fun, and Learning (In That Order) is the first release by indie rock band We Are Scientists. It was released in April 2002. The band have described the release as both a demo album and "rough draft", rather than a proper album and consider With Love and Squalor to be their debut album.

Keith Murray, Chris Cain and Michael Tapper began recording in November 2001, in New York City and finished 12 tracks in January 2002. Two of the tracks had been worked on with former member Scott Lamb.

The release's title was announced on March 14, 2002, on the band's official website as Safety, Fun, and Learning (In That Order) for release in April 2002 through the band's own label, Devious Semantics. Due to issues with setting up their own label, it wasn't until June that the band were able to release it.

== Track listing ==
1. "Over and Out" – 3:15
2. "Ode to Star L23" – 3:49
3. "Spotomatic Freeze" – 3:27
4. "The Bomb Inside the Bomb" – 3:05
5. "Human Technology Will Render You Obsolete" – 2:53
6. "The Creeper" – 3:34
7. "What Gives?" – 2:40
8. "Mothra Versus We Are Scientists" – 3:33
9. "Making a Go" – 2:54
10. "Trickster" – 2:14
11. "Easykill" – 3:19
12. "The Method" – 4:13
