= Business Casual (EP) =

EP by We Are Scientists
- Released: 14 October 2013
- Recorded: 2010–2012
- Genre: Indie rock
- Length: 16:36
- Label: Dine Alone Records

We Are Scientists chronology
Something About You EP (2013)	Business Casual (2013)

Business Casual is the fifth EP by the indie rock band, We Are Scientists. It was released on October 14, 2013.

== Track listing ==
1. "Dumb Luck" – 2:41
2. "Return the Favor" – 3:14
3. "Good Answer" – 3:41
4. "Courage" (Demo) – 2:11
5. "Take My Breath Away" – 5:29
