= Megaplex (album) =

Studio album by We Are Scientists
- Released: April 27, 2018
- Studio: Atomic Heart Studios
- Genre: Indie rock
- Length: 31:00
- Label: 100%
- Producer: Max Hart

We Are Scientists chronology
Helter Seltzer (2016)	Megaplex (2018)	Huffy (2021)

Megaplex is the sixth studio album by American indie rock band We Are Scientists. It was released on April 27, 2018, by 100% Records.

== Critical reception ==
At Metacritic, which assigns a normalized rating out of 100 to reviews from mainstream critics, Megaplex received an average score of 65, which indicates "generally favorable reviews", based on 7 reviews. Steven Loftin of The Line of Best Fit gave Megaplex a rating of 7.5/10, declaring that "We Are Scientists have been back in the lab and are continuing to push themselves outside of their own boundaries" and particularly highlighting the album's use of electronic sounds and the album's "emotive life force". At The Skinny, George Scully rated the album three stars out of five, saying that "party gun cocked and loaded, New York pop-rock armoury We Are Scientists fire a shiny pop bullet with Megaplex, the band's sixth album and a self-proclaimed "stacked-up compound of entertainment." Writing for PopMatters, Chris Conaton gave Megaplex six stars out of ten, remarking that "after a half-dozen albums, We Are Scientists are far from running out of hooks, but these days they seem to deploy those hooks better when they are stretching themselves."

== Promotion ==
=== Release announcement ===
In the album's release announcement, frontman Keith Murray joked "It takes a lot of hard work, a lot of honing of craft to make it to six records. I mean, the Velvet Underground never made six albums. The Smiths didn't. Pavement, Guns N' Roses, The Stooges — none of them could do it. So, I guess we're just objectively better than those bands now? It's just a mathematical fact, right?" He further added, "Our brilliant work in pop song writing is unsurpassed, [...] and will probably make the We Are Scientists name live beyond eternity."

=== Tour ===
The band toured the United Kingdom in support of the new album. This tour ran from March 28 to May 13, 2018, opening at The Joiners in Southampton and concluding in Sheffield after dates in sixteen cities.

=== Singles ===
The first single to be released from Megaplex was the opening track, 'One In, One Out'. This was released with an accompanying video in February 2018. "Your Light Has Changed", "Not Another World", and "Heart is a Weapon" were subsequently released as singles.

== Megaplex: Rise of the Lycans ==
The deluxe edition of Megaplex was released on April 19, 2019, it features fourteen additional tracks and is named for the 2009 American action horror film Underworld: Rise of the Lycans. The additional tracks comprise three full band bonus tracks, four acoustic songs, five demos, and one remix.

== Track listing ==
All tracks are written by We Are Scientists.

No.	Title	Length
1.	"One In, One Out"	3:04
2.	"Notes in a Bottle"	3:21
3.	"Heart is a Weapon"	2:49
4.	"Your Light Has Changed"	2:20
5.	"KIT"	3:15
6.	"No Wait at Five Leaves"	3:27
7.	"Not Another Word"	3:08
8.	"Now or Never"	3:17
9.	"You Failed"	4:26
10.	"Properties of Perception"	2:30
Total length:		31:00
