= Brain Thrust Mastery =

Studio album by We Are Scientists
- Released: March 17, 2008
- Genres: Indie rock, post-punk revival
- Length: 39:57
- Label: EMI
- Producer: Ariel Rechtshaid

We Are Scientists chronology
Crap Attack (2006)	Brain Thrust Mastery (2008)	Barbara (2010)

Singles from Brain Thrust Mastery
- 1. "After Hours" Released: March 3, 2008; 2. "Chick Lit" Released: June 9, 2008; 3. "Impatience" Released: October 27, 2008

Professional ratings
Review scores
Source	Rating
AllMusic	3/5 stars
The A.V. Club	A−
Digital Spy	3/5 stars
The Guardian	3/5 stars
NME	7/10
Pitchfork	5.3/10
Planet Sound	2.5/5 stars
PopMatters	5/10
Q	3/5 stars
Spin	3/5 stars

Brain Thrust Mastery is the second studio album by We Are Scientists, which was released on March 17, 2008.

The first single from the album was "After Hours", which was selected as Jo Whiley's "Pet Sound" on BBC Radio 1 for the week beginning January 28, 2008, and then as Edith Bowman's "Top Rated" on February 11, 2008. Upon release, the album charted at #11 in the UK Albums Chart.

One of the songs of the album, "Let's See It" was also in an episode of Gossip Girl, Season 3, Episode 20.

== Track listing ==
All songs written by Keith Murray & Chris Cain

Brain Thrust Mastery track listing
No.	Title	Length
1.	"Ghouls"	3:00
2.	"Let's See It"	3:57
3.	"After Hours"	3:54
4.	"Lethal Enforcer"	4:45
5.	"Impatience"	3:29
6.	"Tonight"	3:42
7.	"Spoken For"	3:03
8.	"Altered Beast"	3:59
9.	"Chick Lit"	3:56
10.	"Dinosaurs"	3:39
11.	"That's What Counts"	4:21
Total length:		39:57

iTunes pre-Order bonus track
No.	Title	Length
12.	"Best Behaviour"	2:59
Total length:		42:56

Special edition bonus disc (Live at the Union Chapel)
No.	Title	Length
1.	"Nobody Move, Nobody Get Hurt"	6:04
2.	"Lethal Enforcer"	5:42
3.	"Impatience"	4:18
4.	"Let's See It"	4:57
5.	"It's A Hit"	4:49
6.	"After Hours"	4:41
7.	"The Great Escape"	3:37

B-sides
No.	Title	Length
1.	"Dig Dug" (B-side to After Hours)	4:14
2.	"Best Behaviour" (B-side to After Hours)	2:58
3.	"Gauntlet" (B-side to Chick Lit)	3:44
4.	"Dance off" (B-side to Chick Lit)	3:40
5.	"Dinosaurs" (Ibiza Mix) (B-side to Impatience)	7:17
6.	"New Me" (B-side to Impatience)	3:35
7.	"Get Off" (B-side to Impatience)	4:40
