= With Love and Squalor =

Studio album by We Are Scientists
- Released: October 17, 2005
- Recorded: Early 2005
- Genre: Dance-rock; indie rock; post-punk revival
- Length: 36:55
- Label: Virgin (UK, US)
- Producer: Ariel Rechtshaid

We Are Scientists chronology
Safety, Fun, and Learning (In That Order) (2002)	With Love and Squalor (2005)	Crap Attack (2006)

Professional ratings
Review scores
Source	Rating
AllMusic	3/5 stars
Blender	3/5 stars
Drowned in Sound	8/10
NME	7/10
Pitchfork	6.7/10
PopMatters	7/10
Rolling Stone	3/5 stars
Stylus Magazine	C+

With Love and Squalor is the major label debut album from rock band We Are Scientists. It was released in the United Kingdom in October 2005 on Virgin Records and charted at No. 43, with a large cult following which enabled it to after nearly 6 months of release, gain a gold certification by the BPI in 2006. The album sold an average of 4,166 copies each week before it got the certification. The album title is derived from a J.D. Salinger short story, "For Esmé – with Love and Squalor", which was originally published in The New Yorker and subsequently in Nine Stories, a compilation of Salinger's short stories.

== Track listing ==
All tracks are written by Keith Murray, Chris Cain and Michael Tapper.

No.	Title	Length
1.	"Nobody Move, Nobody Get Hurt"	3:12
2.	"This Scene Is Dead"	3:43
3.	"Inaction"	2:32
4.	"Can't Lose"	3:31
5.	"Callbacks"	2:02
6.	"Cash Cow"	2:35
7.	"It's a Hit"	3:26
8.	"The Great Escape"	3:18
9.	"Textbook"	4:01
10.	"Lousy Reputation"	2:35
11.	"Worth the Wait"	2:43
12.	"What's the Word"	3:17
Total length:		36:55

Vinyl edition
No.	Title	Length
13.	"History Repeats"	3:57
14.	"Mucho Más"	2:47
Total length:		43:39

The two songs on the 12-inch vinyl edition were both later released on Crap Attack. These songs were also featured on a 3-song CD that was available for purchase during their tour with Hot Hot Heat.
