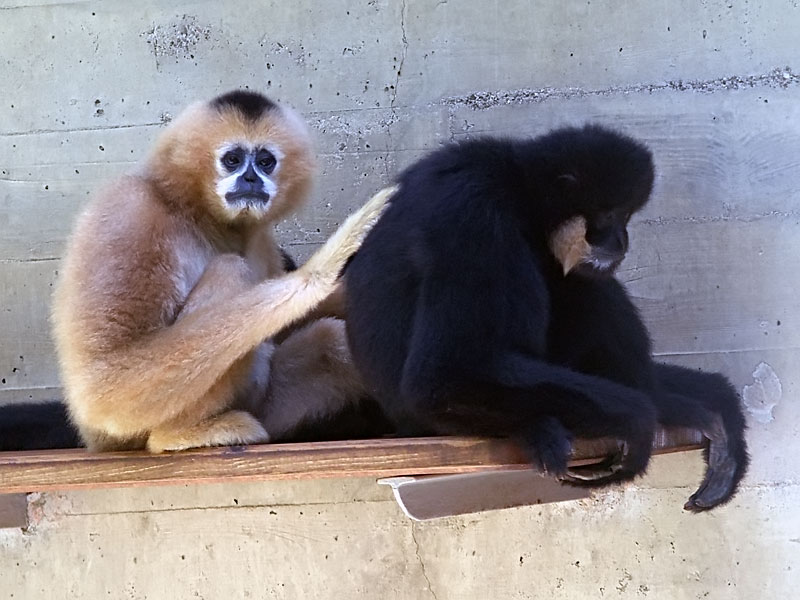
- Female (left) and male

Conservation status
- Critically Endangered (IUCN 3.1)
- CITES Appendix I

Scientific classification
- Kingdom: Animalia
- Phylum: Chordata
- Class: Mammalia
- Infraclass: Placentalia
- Order: Primates
- Superfamily: Hominoidea
- Family: Hylobatidae
- Genus: Nomascus
- Species: N. siki

Binomial name
- Nomascus siki (Delacour, 1951)
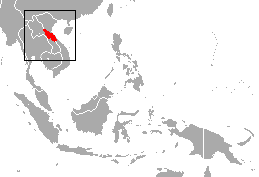
- Southern white-cheeked gibbon range

= Southern white-cheeked gibbon =

Species of ape from Indo-China

The southern white-cheeked gibbon (Nomascus siki) is a species of gibbon, native to Vietnam and Laos. It is closely related to the northern white-cheeked gibbon (Nomascus leucogenys) and the yellow-cheeked gibbon (Nomascus gabriellae); it has previously been identified as a subspecies of each of these.

== Description and habitat ==
Members of the species are not a uniform colour; unweaned juveniles are a light brown, turning to black after weaning. Adult males remain black, but adult females are brown. The name of the species is taken from the male's facial markings, a large patch of white fur around the edge of the mouth - this distinguishes it from a male of N. leucogenys, which has the white in a streak along the cheeks. Females have a thin edging of white around the face.

The species lives in lowland broadleaf forest, with some populations living in forested mountainous areas. As with all gibbons, they are arboreal and frugivorous.

The original distribution covered an area of central Vietnam and central Laos, ranging from the Nam Theun (Khading) and Rao Nay rivers in the north (approximately 19th parallel north) to the Banghiang and Thach Han rivers in the south (approximately 17th parallel north). Between 19 and 20 parallel there appears to be an area of overlap or intergradation between N. siki and N. leucogenys.

Within its original distribution, the species is still common in the remaining large forest blocks in Laos, but in Vietnam the populations are scattered due to human encroachment on their habitat for logging and farming. Numbers are thought to have declined by 50% over the last 45 years, and the species is classed as endangered; it is legally protected in Vietnam, but this is not effectively enforced outside of protected areas. Hunting for food, traditional medicine and the pet trade is a serious threat to this species in both Laos and Vietnam.

== Taxonomy ==
The taxon was first formally identified in 1951 by Jean Théodore Delacour where he described siki as a subspecies of N. concolor (a species placed in Hylobates at that time). Since its description, it has been considered to be a subspecies of variously N. leucogenys, N. gabriellae, or N. concolor. The assignation of N. siki as a subspecies of N. gabriellae was due to the interpretation of a single baculum, but later research indicated that the specimen was part of a different species. It was then assigned to N. leucogenys due to similarities of its song, as well as strong visual similarities between the females of the two species. However, it has been considered a separate species since 2001.

In the north of the range of N. siki, it overlaps or intergrades with N. leucogenys, and based on mtDNA and voices, these species are closer to each other than to the remaining Nomascus; some maintain that N. siki should be regarded as a subspecies of N. leucogenys. A southern population formerly associated with N. siki was described as a new species, N. annamensis in 2010.
