= Eastern black crested gibbon =

Conservation status
- Critically Endangered (IUCN 3.1)
- CITES Appendix I

Scientific classification
- Kingdom: Animalia
- Phylum: Chordata
- Class: Mammalia
- Order: Primates
- Superfamily: Hominoidea
- Family: Hylobatidae
- Genus: Nomascus
- Species: N. nasutus

Binomial name
- Nomascus nasutus (Künckel d'Herculais, 1884)
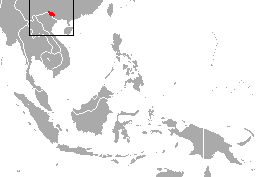
- Eastern black crested gibbon area

Species of Old World ape

The eastern black crested gibbon (Nomascus nasutus), also called Cao-vit black crested gibbon or the Cao-vit crested gibbon, is a Critically Endangered species of gibbon from southeast China and northern Vietnam. The term "Cao-vit" originated from the sounds of their calls or songs that villagers of Ngoc Khe, Phong Nam and Ngoc Con communes of Trung Khanh District, Cao Bang Province of Vietnam use to name for them.

This name was officially used by gibbon experts since the rediscovery. From the 1960s until the 2000s there had been no confirmed sightings of the eastern black-crested gibbon and it was thought to be possibly extinct. In 2002 a small population was rediscovered by two FFI biologists in a karst forest of Trùng Khánh District, Cao Bằng Province, in northeast Vietnam. The species was endemic to Vietnam until 2006 when they were also found in a small forest in Guangxi Province of China, which is adjacent to Trung Khanh forests. In 2005 it was estimated that this population in Vietnam side was about 35–37 individuals.

In a 2024 reassessment using vocal fingerprinting of individual males, together with passive acoustic monitoring and thermal imaging, researchers estimated that the population numbered 74 individuals in 11 family groups, about 38% fewer than previously thought. The authors found no evidence that the population had declined, attributing the lower figure to double-counting of groups in earlier surveys that relied on triangulating songs, and noted that the population appeared to be growing, with new groups having formed in recent years. Fauna & Flora reports that the population roughly doubled over the preceding 20 years and that two infants were recorded in 2024 and 2025.

The eastern black crested gibbon is one of the rarest and most critically endangered primates in the world. This status has resulted from deforestation of its habitat, encroachment, and poaching.

The eastern black crested gibbon is classified as separate from other crested gibbons based on molecular data, fur coloration, and differences in vocal communication. Previously it had been considered conspecific with the Hainan black crested gibbon or as a subspecies of the black crested gibbon. Until the sequencing of the mitochondrial cytochrome b gene the Hainan black crested gibbon was thought to be Nomascus nasutus hainanus, a subspecies of eastern black crested gibbon. The researchers proposed that the genetic separation showed it was a distinct species.

== Dance ==
Female eastern black crested gibbons have been observed to make rhythmic displays, researchers described as dancing. These have been suggested to be a form of non-aggressive competition among females. Females with a weaker relationship with the breeding male gained increased social and sexual access to them by increasing the frequency of these dancing displays. Researchers suggested such rhythmic displays "may offer new insights into our understanding of origin of human dance and language".
