= Tonkin black crested gibbon =

Conservation status
- Critically Endangered (IUCN 3.1)

Scientific classification
- Kingdom: Animalia
- Phylum: Chordata
- Class: Mammalia
- Order: Primates
- Suborder: Haplorhini
- Infraorder: Simiiformes
- Family: Hylobatidae
- Genus: Nomascus
- Species: N. concolor
- Subspecies: N. c. concolor

Trinomial name
- Nomascus concolor concolor (Harlan, 1826)

Synonyms
- List: ? furvogaster Ma & Wang, 1986; ? jingdongensis Ma & Wang, 1986; Hylobates concolor subsp. concolor; Hylobates concolor subsp. furvogaster (Ma & Wang, 1986); Hylobates concolor subsp. jingdongensis (Ma & Wang, 1986); Nomascus concolor subsp. furvogaster (Ma & Y.Wang, 1986); Nomascus concolor subsp. jingdongensis (Ma & Y.Wang, 1986)

Subspecies of primate

The Tonkin black crested gibbon (Nomascus concolor concolor) is a critically endangered subspecies of the black crested gibbon found in Yunnan and Vietnam.

== Distribution ==
=== Geographic range ===
The Tonkin black crested gibbon is found occurs in central and southwestern Yunnan (China) and in northern Vietnam, precisely in Lao Cai, Yen Bai, Son La and Lai Châu provinces.

=== Habitat ===
The Tonkin black-crested gibbon lives in forests at altitudes of between 1,800 and 2,500 m (5,900 and 8,200 ft).

== Behavior ==
=== Social structure ===
The Tonkin black-crested gibbon lives in groups.

=== Feeding ===
The Tonkin black-crested gibbon feeds mainly on leaves, fruits, figs and flowers.

== Conservation ==
=== Status ===
As of November 2015, the Tonkin black crested gibbon is critically endangered.

=== Threats ===
The Tonkin black-crested gibbon is threatened by the destructive use of local forests, hunting, selective logging and the encroachment of agriculture on its environment.
