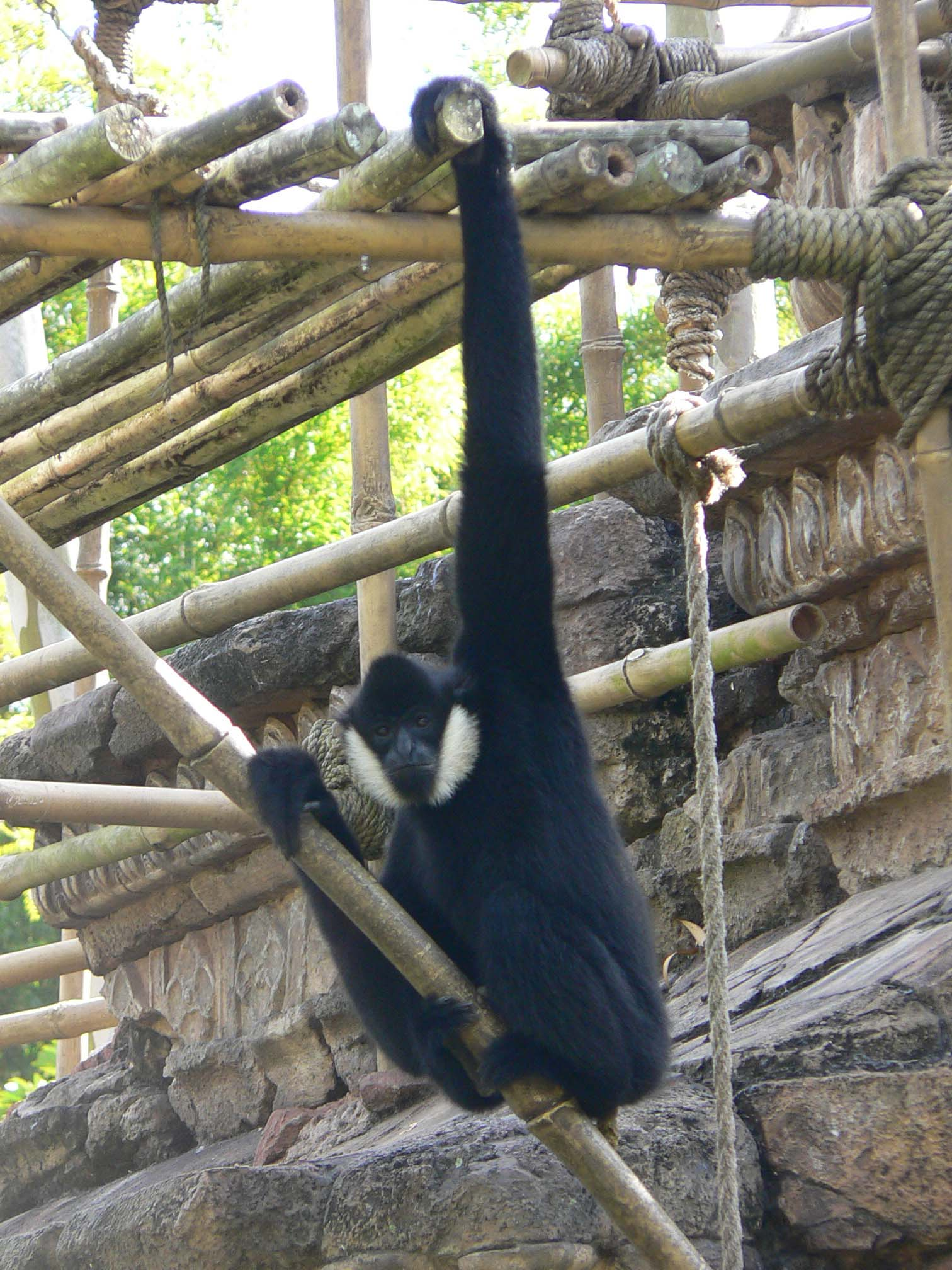
- Northern white-cheeked gibbon Nomascus leucogenys

Scientific classification
- Kingdom: Animalia
- Phylum: Chordata
- Class: Mammalia
- Order: Primates
- Superfamily: Hominoidea
- Family: Hylobatidae
- Genus: Nomascus; Miller, 1933

Type species
- Hylobates leucogenys Ogilby, 1840

Species
- Nomascus concolor Nomascus nasutus Nomascus hainanus †Nomascus imperialis Nomascus leucogenys Nomascus siki Nomascus gabriellae Nomascus annamensis
- Map showing the distribution of Nomascus species Nomascus leucogenys - Extant Nomascus leucogenys - Possibly Extant Nomascus leucogenys - Possibly Extinct Nomascus concolor - Extant Nomascus concolor - Possibly Extant Nomascus nasutus - Extant Nomascus siki - Extant Nomascus hainanus - Extant Nomascus annamensis - Extant Nomascus gabriellae - Extant

= Nomascus =

Genus of apes

Nomascus is the second-most speciose genus of the gibbon family, Hylobatidae. Originally, this genus was a subgenus of Hylobates, with all individuals considered to be one species, H. concolor.

Species within Nomascus are characterized by 52 chromosomes. Some species are all-black, some are a lighter beige or peach hue, with a distinct black tuft of crown fur, while others have notable, light-colored cheek “patches”. Nomascus is endemic from southern China (Yunnan) to southern Vietnam, and can also be found on Hainan. Every species within this genus are either endangered or critically endangered; the Eastern black crested gibbon (Nomascus nasutus) has been deemed "the most-critically endangered ape species in the world".

== Extant species ==
Genus Nomascus – Miller, 1933 – seven species
Common name	Scientific name and subspecies	Range	Size and ecology	IUCN status and estimated population
Black crested gibbon	Nomascus concolor (Harlan, 1826) Four subspecies: Tonkin black crested gibbon, Nomascus concolor concolor; Laotian black crested gibbon, Nomascus concolor lu; Central Yunnan black crested gibbon, Nomascus concolor jingdongensis; West Yunnan black crested gibbon, Nomascus concolor furvogaster	China, Laos, and northern Vietnam	Size: Habitat: Diet:	CR
Eastern black crested gibbon	Nomascus nasutus (Künckel d'Herculais, 1884)	northeast Vietnam	Size: Habitat: Diet:	CR
Hainan black crested gibbon	Nomascus hainanus (Thomas, 1892)	Hainan Island, China.	Size: Habitat: Diet:	CR
Northern white-cheeked gibbon	Nomascus leucogenys (Ogilby, 1840)	northern Vietnam and northern Laos	Size: Habitat: Diet:	CR
Southern white-cheeked gibbon	Nomascus siki (Delacour, 1951)	Vietnam and Laos.	Size: Habitat: Diet:	EN
Yellow-cheeked gibbon	Nomascus gabriellae (Thomas, 1909)	Vietnam, Laos, and Cambodia	Size: Habitat: Diet:	EN
Northern buffed-cheeked gibbon	Nomascus annamensis Thinh et al., 2010	Vietnam, Cambodia, and Laos.	Size: Habitat: Diet:	EN

=== Extinct species ===
- Imperial gibbon, Nomascus imperialis (extinct ca. ~200 BC or later, formerly placed in genus Junzi)

== Classification ==
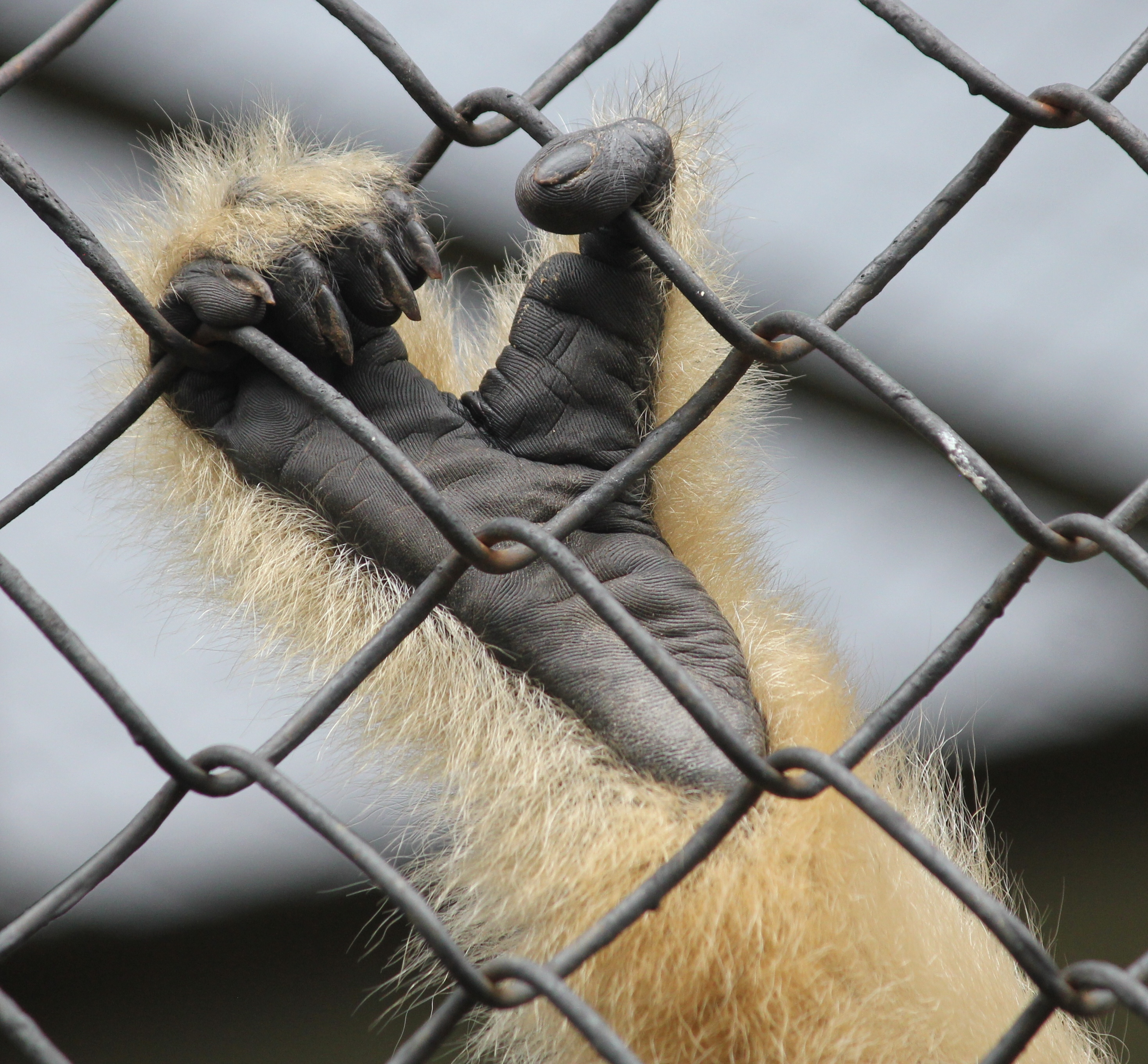
Foot of a captive gibbon (N. gabriellae)

- Family Hylobatidae: gibbons
  - Genus Hylobates
  - Genus Hoolock
  - Genus Symphalangus
  - Genus Nomascus
    - Black crested gibbon, Nomascus concolor
      - Tonkin black crested gibbon, Nomascus concolor concolor
      - Laotian black crested gibbon, Nomascus concolor lu
      - Central Yunnan black crested gibbon, Nomascus concolor jingdongensis
      - West Yunnan black crested gibbon, Nomascus concolor furvogaster
    - Eastern black crested gibbon, Nomascus nasutus
    - Hainan black crested gibbon, Nomascus hainanus
    - †Imperial gibbon, Nomascus imperialis
    - Northern white-cheeked gibbon, Nomascus leucogenys
    - Southern white-cheeked gibbon, Nomascus siki
    - Yellow-cheeked gibbon, Nomascus gabriellae
    - Northern buffed-cheeked gibbon, Nomascus annamensis
