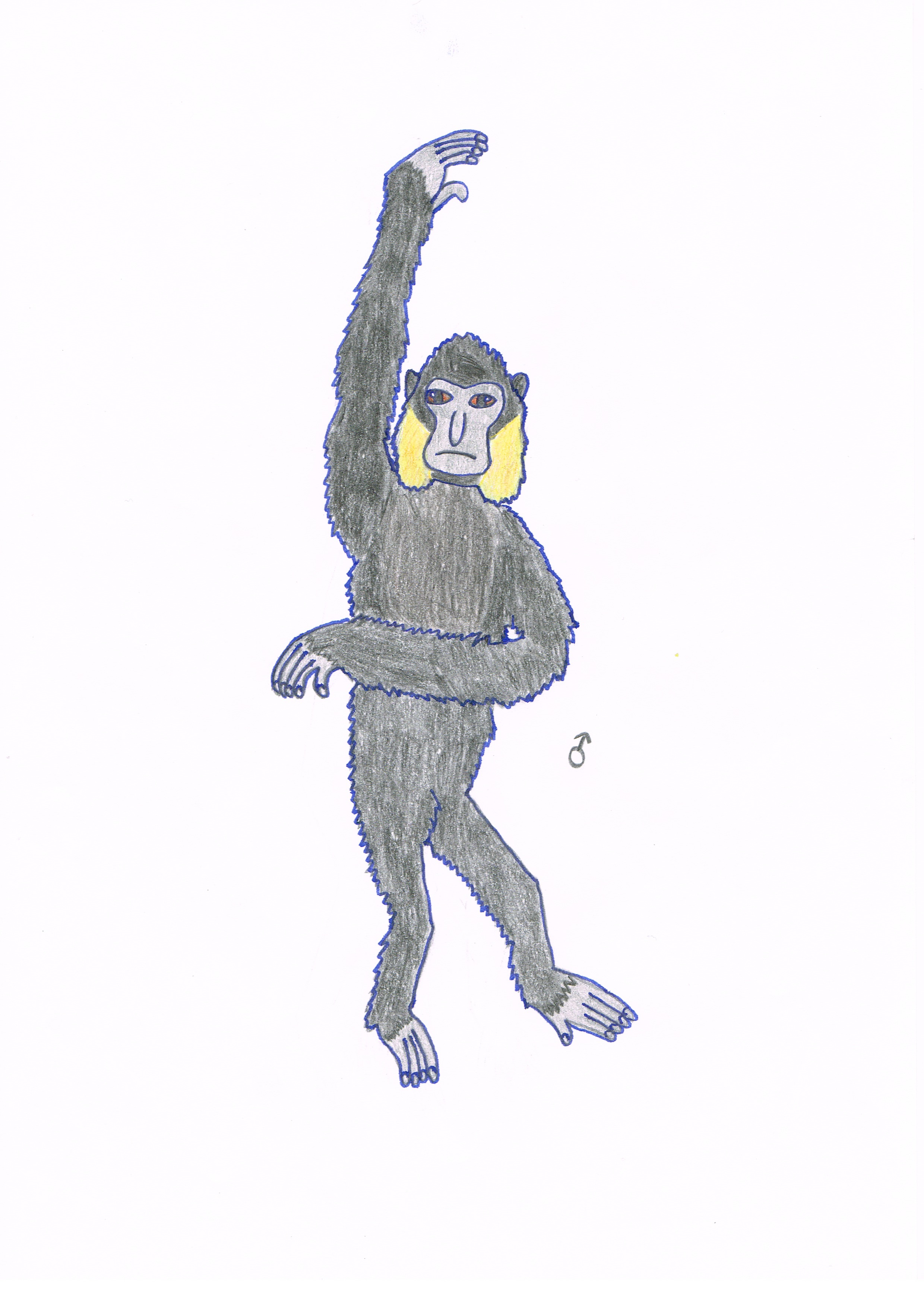
- Male
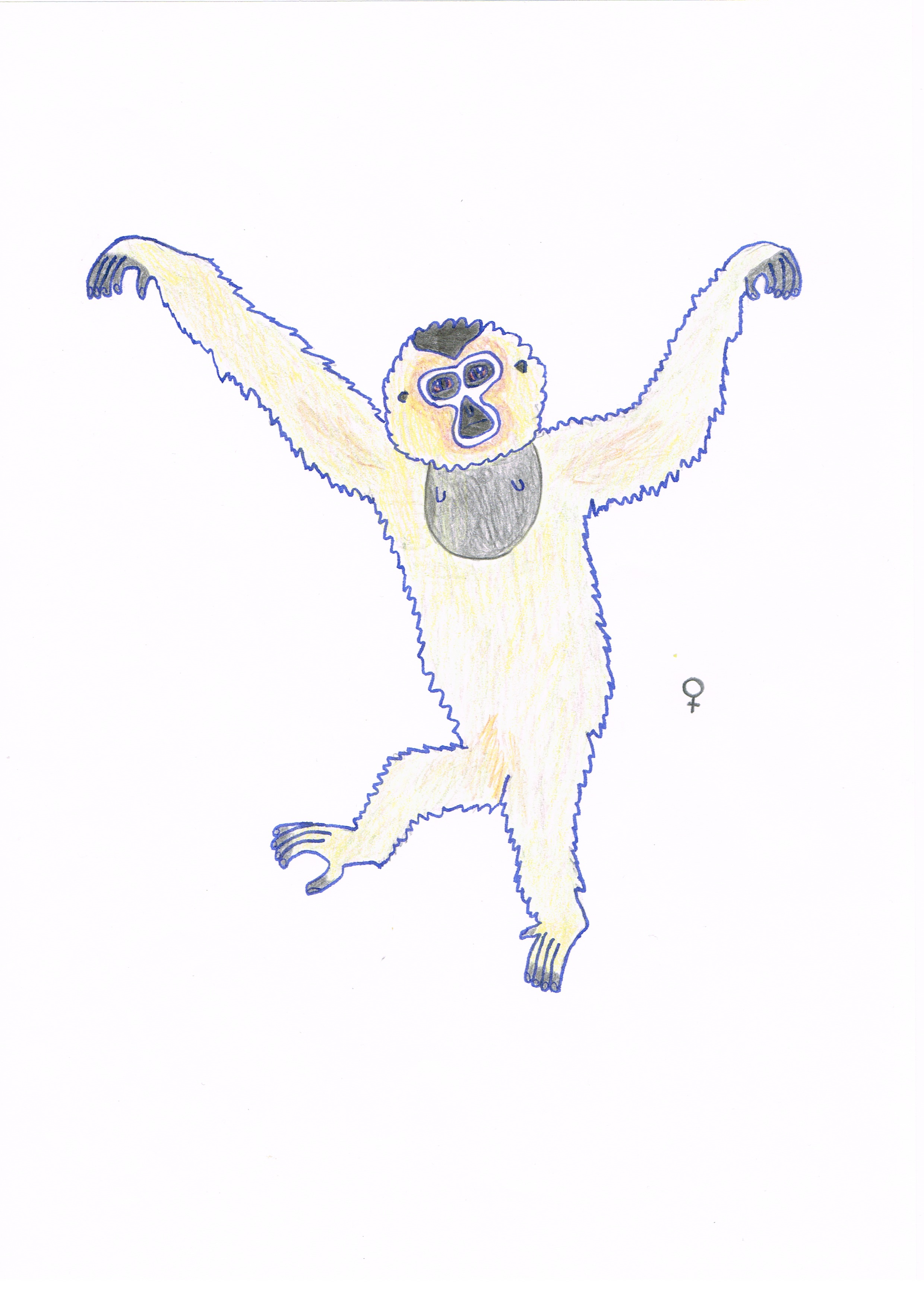
- Female

Conservation status
- Endangered (IUCN 3.1)
- CITES Appendix I

Scientific classification
- Kingdom: Animalia
- Phylum: Chordata
- Class: Mammalia
- Order: Primates
- Superfamily: Hominoidea
- Family: Hylobatidae
- Genus: Nomascus
- Species: N. annamensis

Binomial name
- Nomascus annamensis Thinh et al., 2010
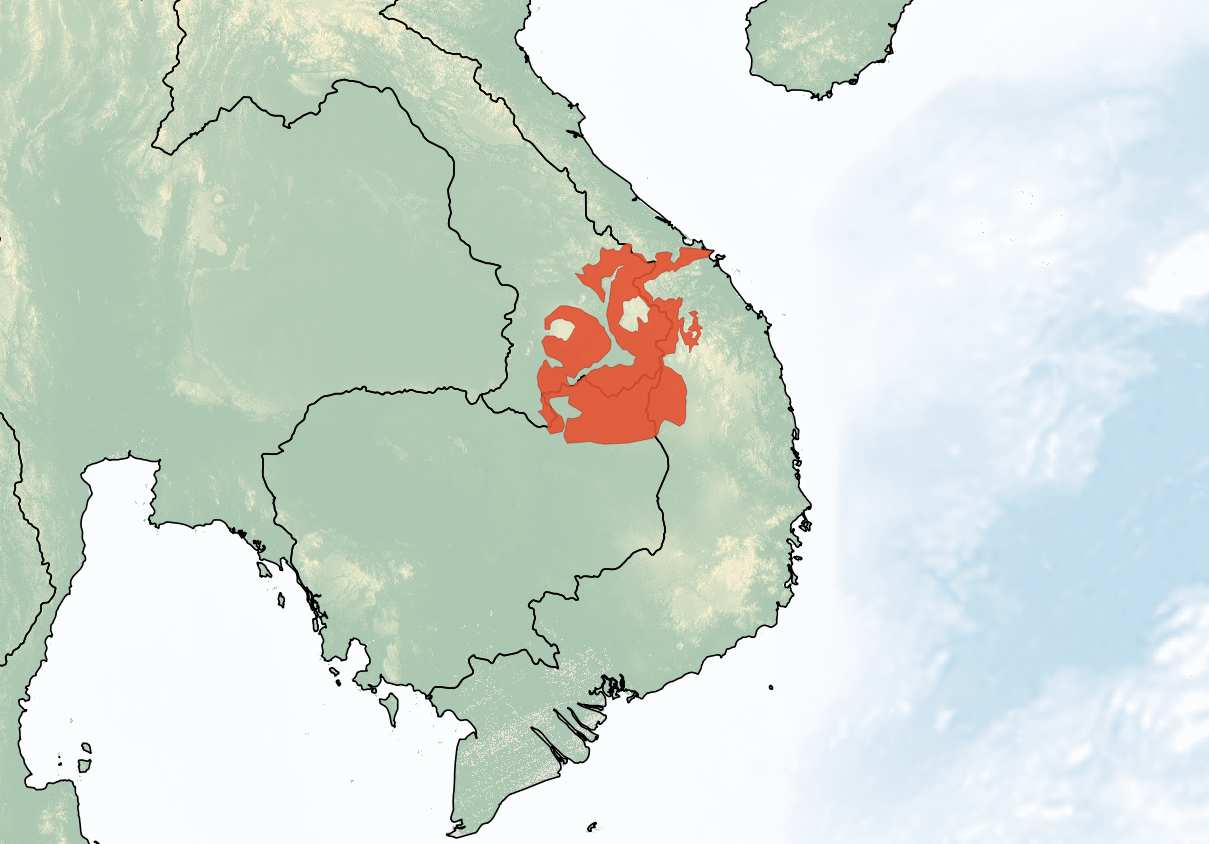

= Northern buffed-cheeked gibbon =

Species of primate

The northern buffed-cheeked gibbon (Nomascus annamensis) is a species of crested gibbon which is found in Vietnam, Cambodia, and Laos. Its habitat is in the humid subtropical and seasonal tropical forests of these countries.

== Description ==
The northern buffed-cheeked gibbon resembles Nomascus gabriellae in appearance. Males and females of N. annamensis differ in morphology and color. The male has a primarily black pelt that glistens silver in sunlight, with a lighter brown chest. The cheeks are a deep golden-orange, and the crest is very prominent. The female, though, lacks the characteristic crest and is orange-beige in color.

The holotype is located in the Zoological Museum of the Vietnam National University.
