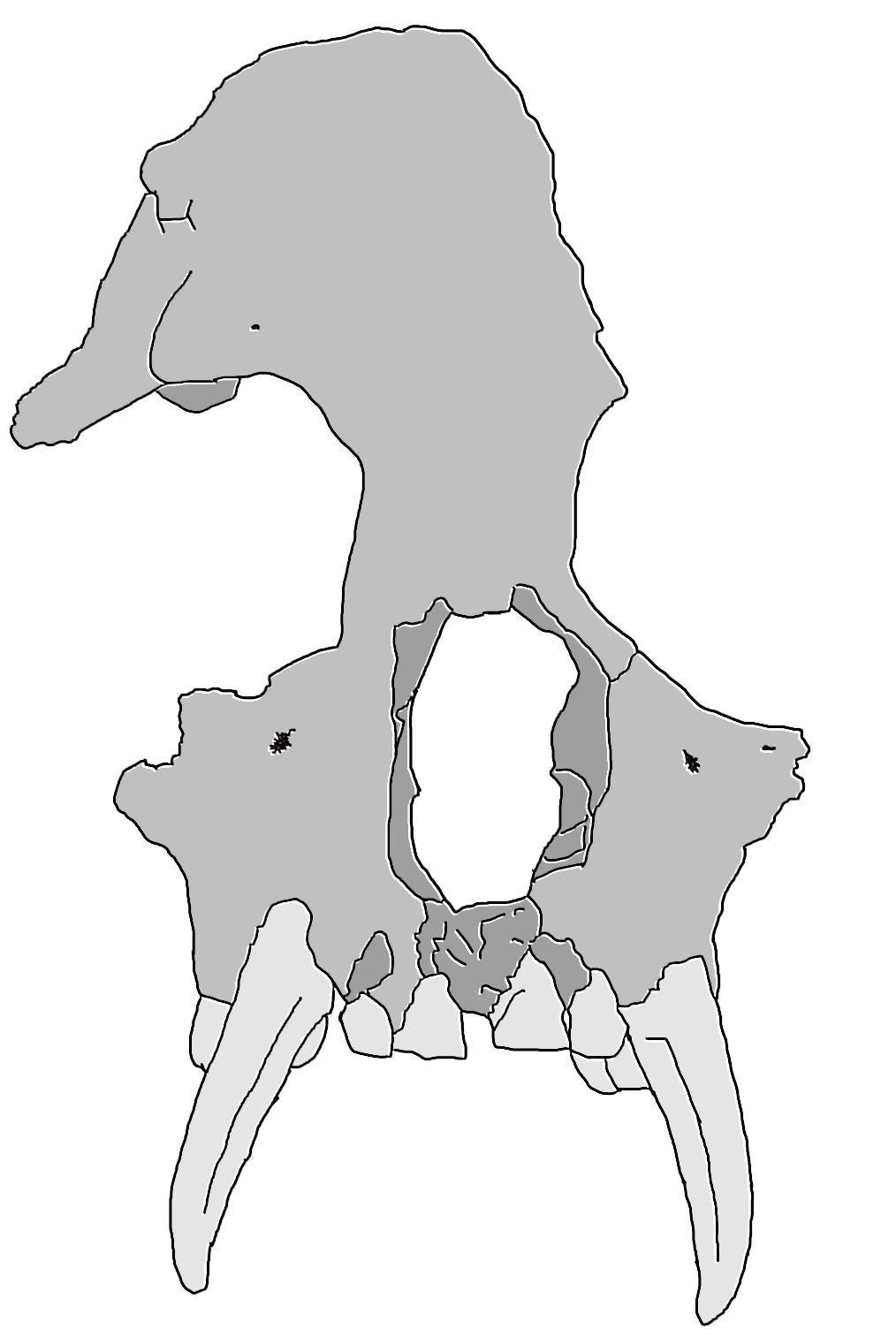
- Illustration of the holotype specimen

Conservation status
- Extinct

Scientific classification
- Kingdom: Animalia
- Phylum: Chordata
- Class: Mammalia
- Infraclass: Placentalia
- Order: Primates
- Superfamily: Hominoidea
- Family: Hylobatidae
- Genus: Nomascus
- Species: †N. imperialis

Binomial name
- †Nomascus imperialis (Turvey et al., 2018)

Synonyms
- Junzi imperialis Turvey et al., 2018

= Nomascus imperialis =

Nomascus imperialis Temporal range: Holocene, 0.004–0.002 Ma

Extinct species of gibbon

Nomascus imperialis (formerly Junzi imperialis), also known as the imperial gibbon, is a recently extinct species of gibbon that inhabited central China during the late Holocene. It went extinct at some point after 200 BC, potentially as late as the 18th century.

The type specimen was found in an Ancient Chinese noblewoman's tomb. It is believed that when alive, during the Warring States period around 2,200 to 2,300 years ago, it was owned by Lady Xia, the mother of King Zhuangxiang of Qin and grandmother of Qin Shi Huang, the first emperor of China.

== Taxonomy ==
The species was named based on the type specimen, an incomplete skull, in 2018 by Samuel Turvey and colleagues. It was described as Junzi imperialis, the only member of the monotypic genus Junzi, due to the distinctive morphology of its molar teeth and skull. The original generic name Junzi was coined by Turvey and his colleagues in reference to how gibbons were, in ancient China, kept by noblemen scholars, or junzi (君子), as pets. The study's authors were not allowed by Chinese authorities to sample the gibbon's DNA, and the species was thus placed in its own genus based on exclusively morphological evidence.

In 2025, a phylogenetic study of extant and extinct gibbons extracted DNA from the type specimen as well as another, older specimen, and found it to group within the genus Nomascus as the sister species to the highly endangered Hainan gibbon, one of the only extant gibbons remaining in China. It was thus moved to the genus Nomascus.

== Distribution ==
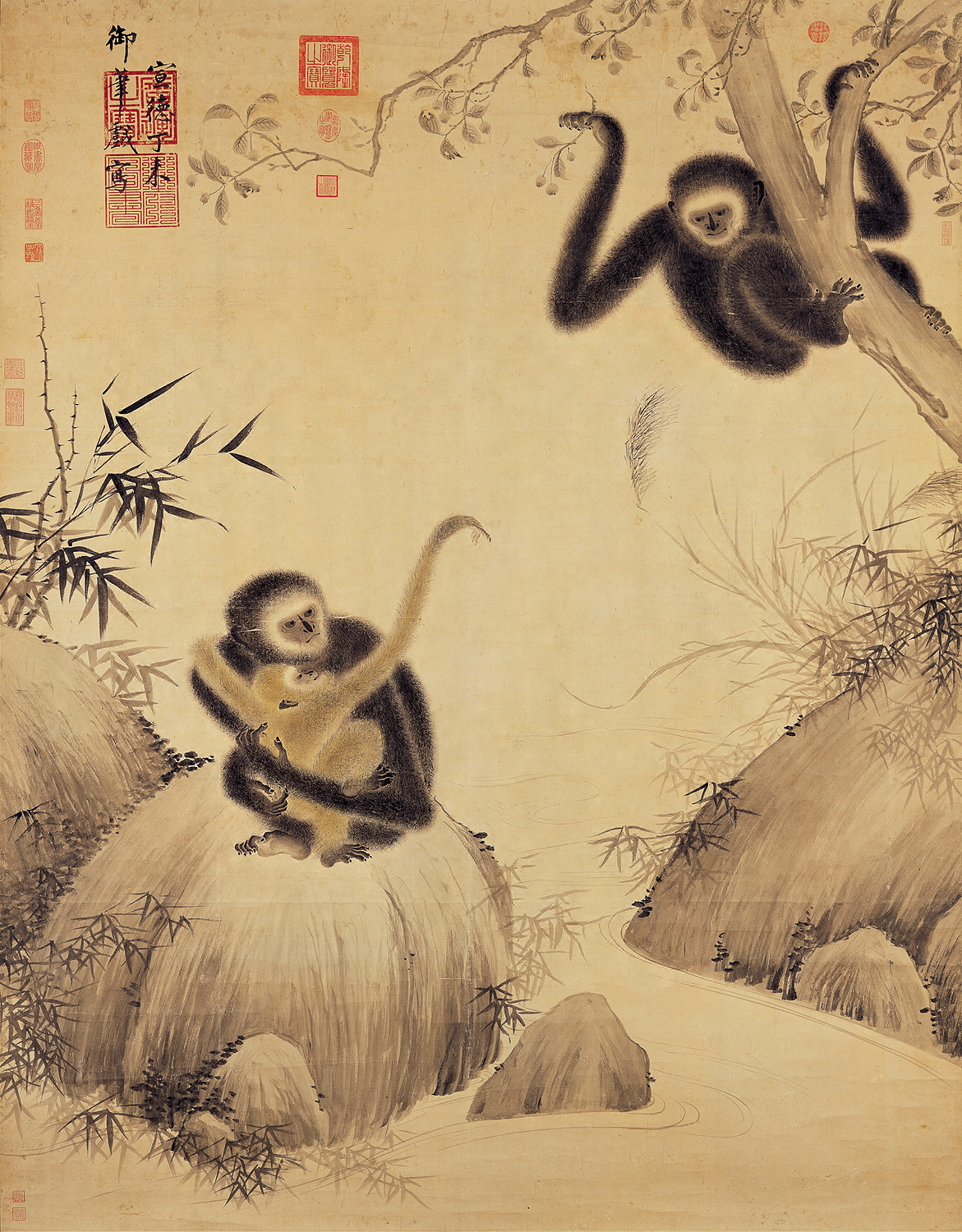
Gibbons were depicted in historical Chinese art, here from 1427

Gibbons were recorded by ancient Chinese sources to have been found as far north as the Yellow River. Nomascus imperialis is the northernmost known gibbon, with 4,000-year-old subfossil remains of a wild individual identified from Yemao Cave in Chongqing. The northernmost record of the imperial gibbon, and of any gibbon, is of the captive individual kept by Lady Xia, which was identified from Shaanxi. Although this individual was captive, other animals in the menagerie appear to have had local origins, and it is thus assumed that this individual was caught locally and the species did naturally reach as far north as Shaanxi. This is supported by historical accounts suggesting that gibbons occurred in Shaanxi up to the 18th century.

== Extinction ==
The imperial gibbon is the only known ape species to have gone extinct in the Holocene. The cause of its extinction remains uncertain, but likely owes to the mass deforestation occurring in central China during the Imperial period. The region inhabited by the species supported the highest human densities in the world for millennia, and extensive deforestation occurred in the range of the species by the late Imperial period. Remaining forests in the area were high-elevation, which were likely suboptimal for this species due to its potential dependency on lowland forests.

== Discovery ==
The holotype skull was discovered when Lady Xia's tomb was opened in 2004. The living animal is thought to have been a member of Lady Xia's menagerie of luxury pets, which also included cranes, leopards, lynxes, and a black bear.
