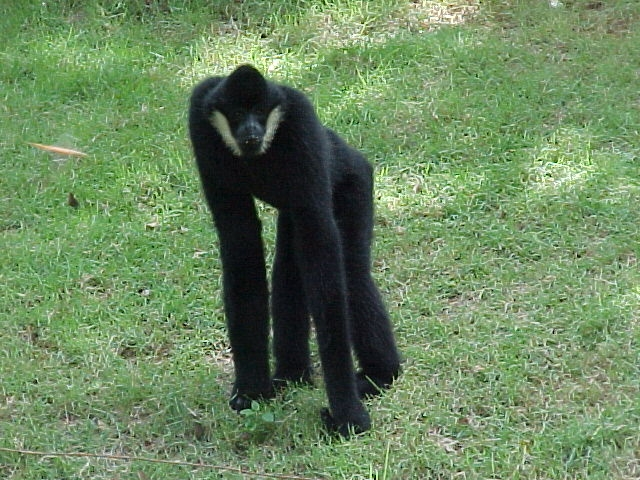
- Adult male
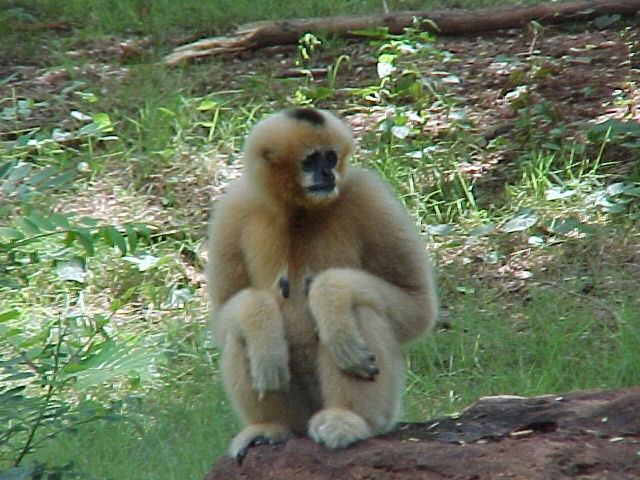
- Adult female

Conservation status
- Critically Endangered (IUCN 3.1)
- CITES Appendix I

Scientific classification
- Kingdom: Animalia
- Phylum: Chordata
- Class: Mammalia
- Infraclass: Placentalia
- Order: Primates
- Superfamily: Hominoidea
- Family: Hylobatidae
- Genus: Nomascus
- Species: N. leucogenys

Binomial name
- Nomascus leucogenys (Ogilby, 1840)
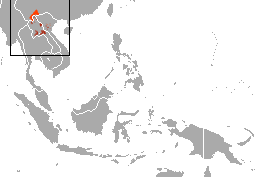
- Northern white-cheeked gibbon range (brown — extant, orange — probably extinct)

Synonyms
- Hylobates leucogenys (Ogilby, 1840)

= Northern white-cheeked gibbon =

Species of Old World monkey

The northern white-cheeked gibbon (Nomascus leucogenys) is a Critically Endangered species of gibbon native to South East Asia.

It is closely related to the southern white-cheeked gibbon (Nomascus siki), with which it was previously considered conspecific. The females of the two species are virtually indistinguishable in appearance.

The genome of N. leucogenys was sequenced and published in 2011.

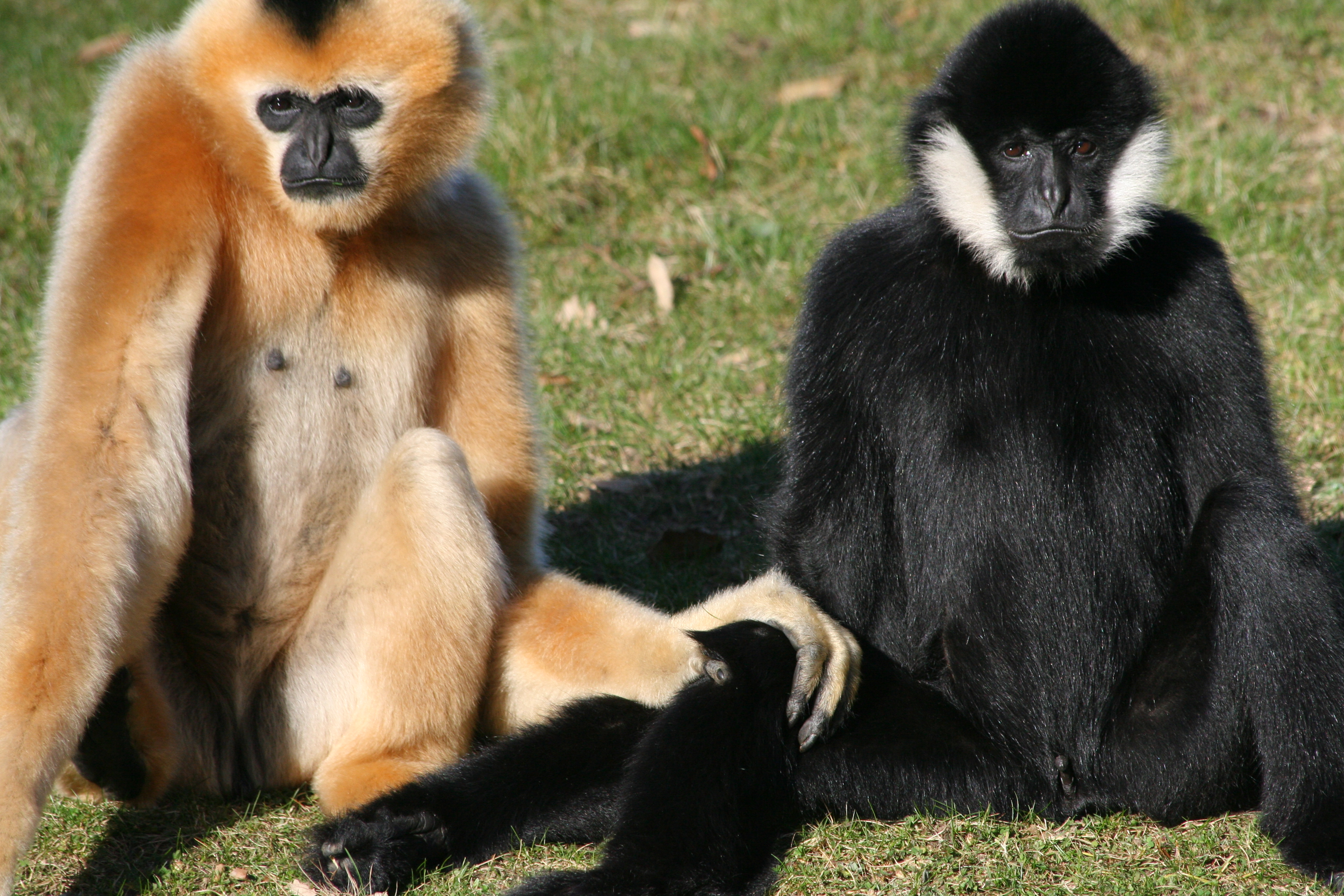
Adult female and adult male.

== Description ==
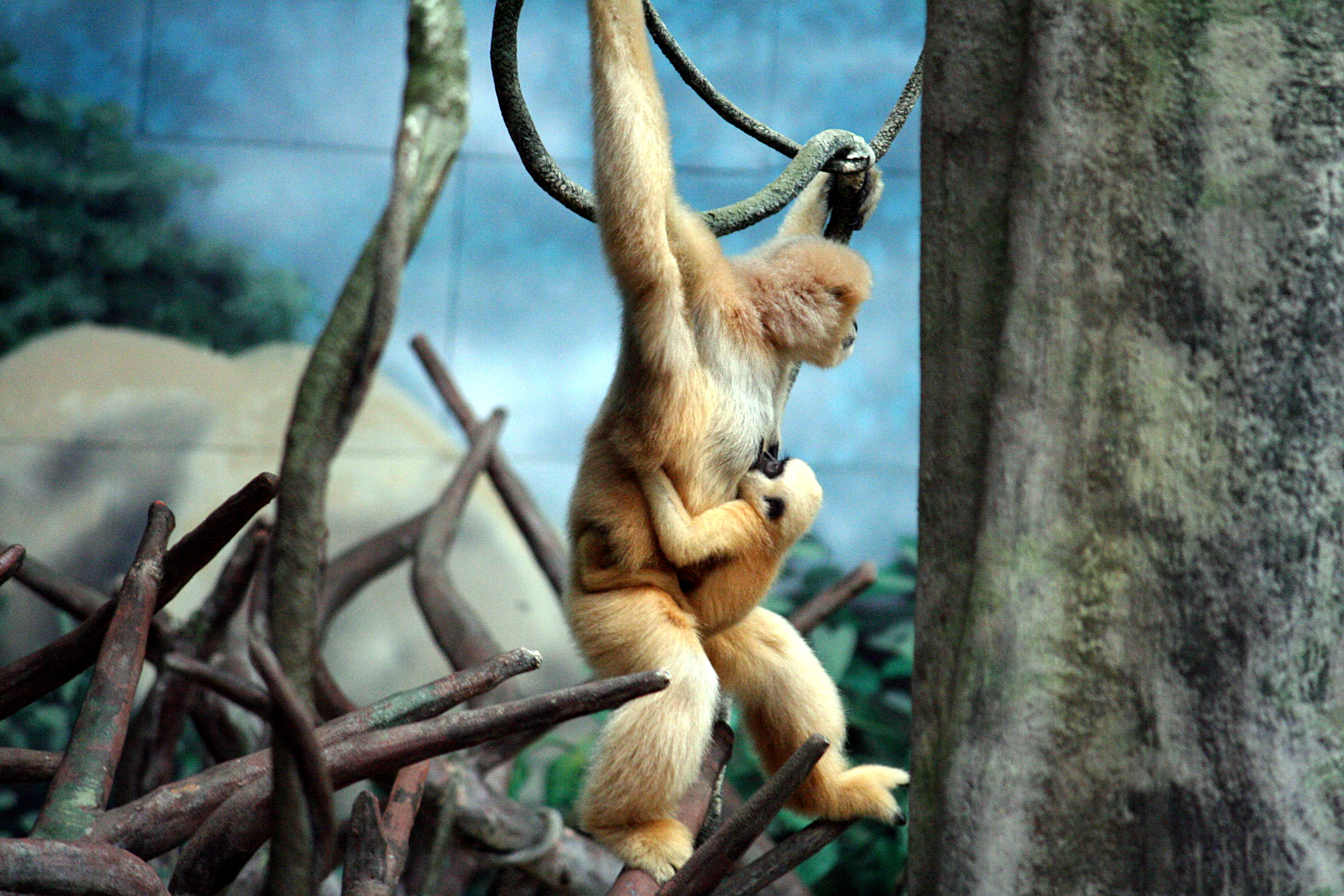
A female northern white-cheeked gibbon and her offspring, Brookfield Zoo, United States

Northern white-cheeked gibbons are sexually dimorphic, with males and females having different colourations and the former also being slightly larger. Males have black hair over their entire bodies, except for distinct white patches on their cheeks, as well as a prominent tuft of hair on the crown of head, and a gular sac. Females are reddish-tan in colour, lack a cranial tuft, and have a crest of black or dark brown fur running from the crown to the nape of the neck. They are reported to have an average weight of 7.5 kg (17 lb), although this is based on only a small number of wild individuals, and those in captivity appear to be larger.

Like other members of their genus, both males and females have unusually long arms, even for gibbons, with the arms being 1.2 to 1.4 times as long as the legs. They are also more muscular, with heavier thighs and shoulders that suggest a greater bodily strength. Adults have been shown to demonstrate a hand preference while swinging through the trees, with individuals being equally likely to be right or left handed.

The species closely resembles the southern white-cheeked gibbon, but has slightly longer body hair and subtly different vocalisations. The males can also be distinguished by the shape of the white patches on their cheeks; in the northern species, these reach the upper borders of the ears, and do not touch the corners of the mouth, whereas in the southern species, they reach only halfway to the ears and entirely surround the lips.

Both males and females have been reported to produce reddish-brown secretions from glands around their upper chest, hips, and ankles. However, samples of sweat taken from the axillae and chest possess lower levels of steroids in white-cheeked gibbons than in many other species of ape, suggesting that olfactory signals may be less important in these animals than in their relatives.

== Distribution and habitat ==
Today, the northern white-cheeked gibbon is found only in northern Vietnam and northern Laos. They were formerly also known from southern China, in Yunnan province, where they were reported to be on the edge of extirpation in 2008.

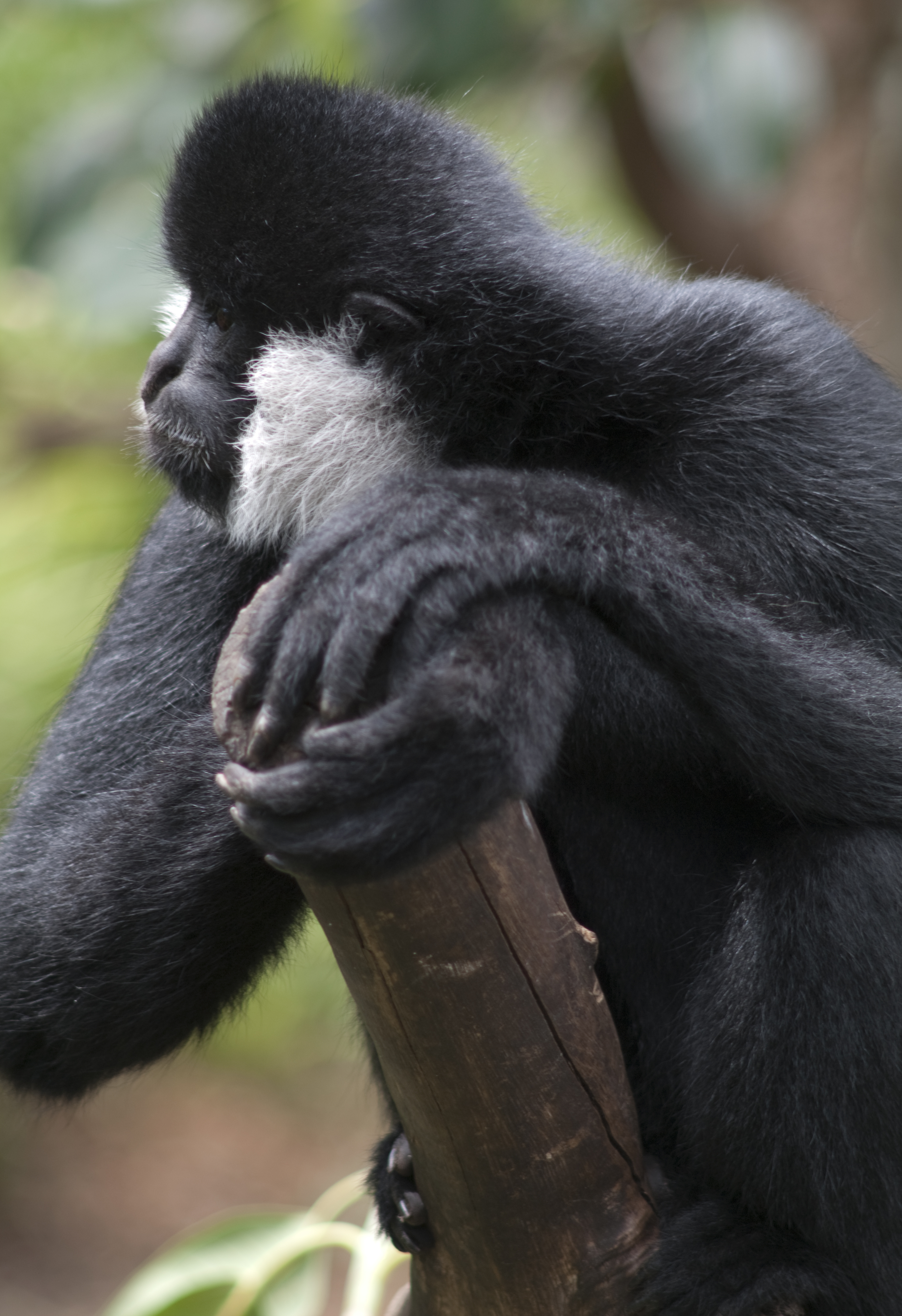
Male northern white-cheeked gibbon, adelaide zoo.

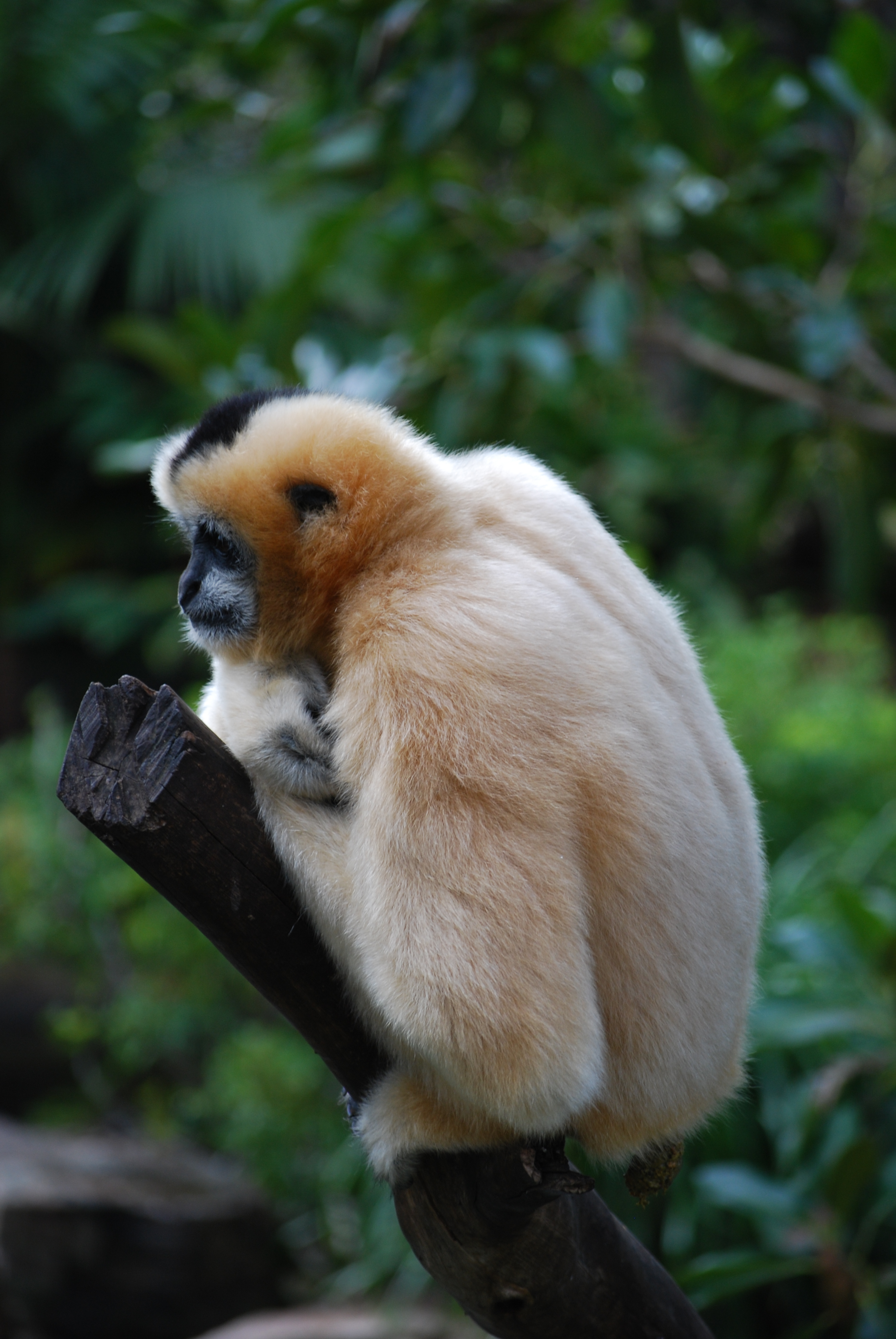
Female northern white-cheeked gibbon, Adelaide zoo.

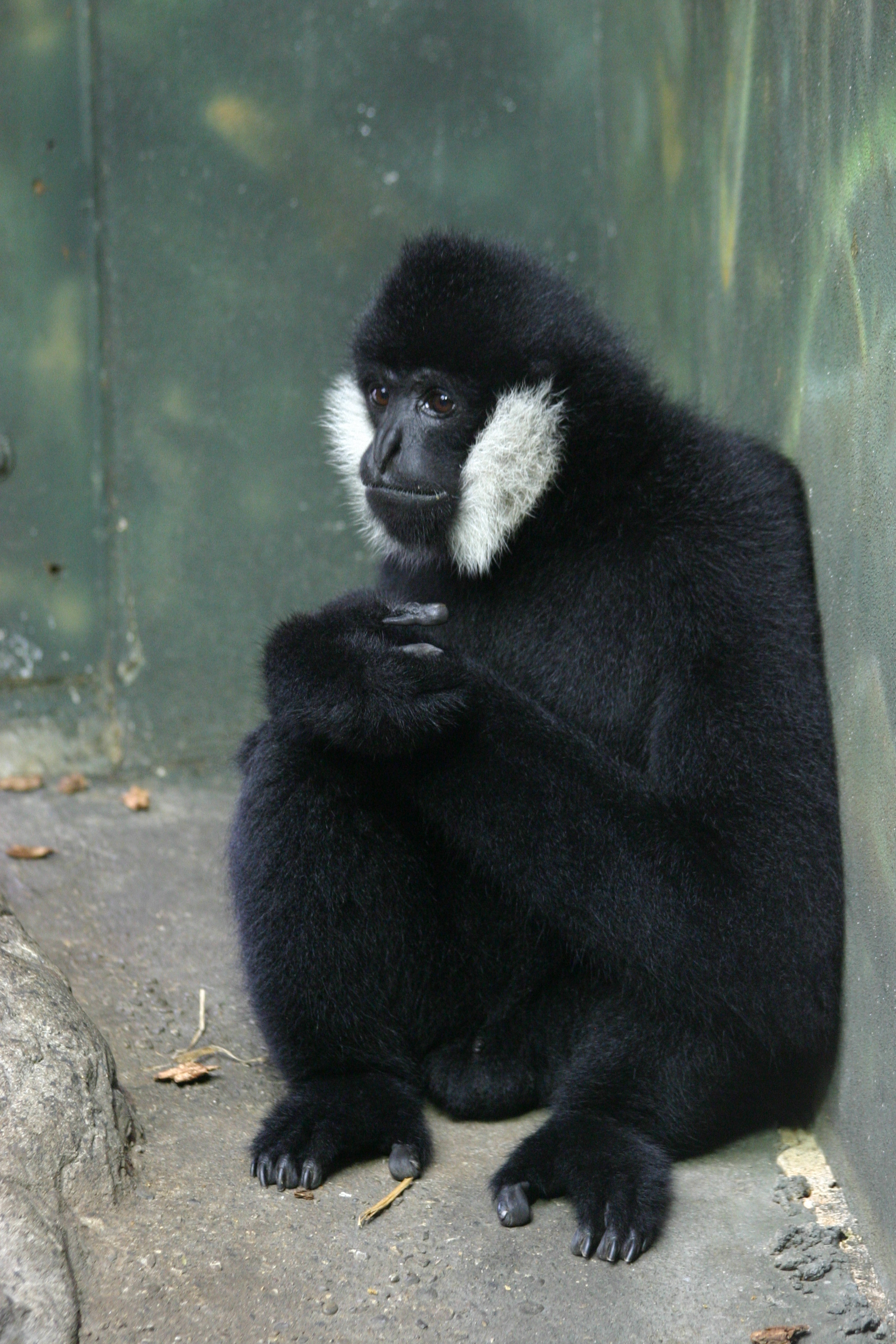
Northern White-Cheeked Gibbon (Nomascus leucogenys)

They were confirmed to be extinct in China in 2013.

In Laos, a population of 57 gibbon groups was estimated at the Nam Et-Phou Louey National Protected Area in 2019.

In Vietnam, at least 22 groups of N. leucogenys were confirmed in Pù Mát National Park in Nghệ An Province, northern Vietnam, near the border with Laos. Another population of 64 groups and 182 individuals were confirmed by Center for Nature Conservation and Development in Xuan Lien nature reserve, Thanh Hoa province, Vietnam in 2020 through a two-year gibbon monitoring program. This is a significant increase from baseline data of 41 groups and 127 individuals recorded in 2011.

No subspecies are currently recognised, although the southern white-cheeked gibbon was formerly considered to be a subspecies of N. leucogenys. The gibbon inhabits primary evergreen subtropical forest between 200 and 1,650 metres (660 and 5,410 ft) in elevation.

== Behaviour and diet ==
The northern white-cheeked gibbon is arboreal in habits, and primarily herbivorous, feeding mainly on fruits, with some leaves, buds, and flowers. However, up to 10% of their diet may be composed of insects and other small animals. They are generally sociable, living in groups of up to six individuals. Individual groups do not travel far, and are believed to be territorial. They are diurnal, and spend the night sleeping in high branches, often embracing one another tightly. Behavioural studies have demonstrated that they are capable of self-recognition in mirrors.

The calls of northern white-cheeked gibbons are among the most complex of those produced by gibbons, and are significantly different between males and females. The most distinctive calls are those made as part of male-female duets. These begin with the female making a series of 15 to 30 notes with an increasing pitch, followed by the male complex call with rapid changes of frequency modulation. The cycle, which lasts less than 20 seconds, then repeats with increasing intensity for five to 17 minutes. In the closely related southern species, such duets are most common at dawn, and are apparently only made on sunny days. In captive studies, males and females that sing duets together the most frequently are the most likely to mate, indicating this may play a key role in pair-bonding.

Similar calls are sometimes made solo by both sexes, and juveniles sometimes join in, to create a full 'chorus'. In addition to the duet and solo great calls, males can also make booming sounds with their gular sacs, and short single notes.

== Reproduction ==
Northern white-cheeked gibbons are monogamous, with long-lasting pair bonds. The ovarian cycle has been reported to last an average of 22 days, and gestation lasts 200 to 212 days.

At birth, both sexes are covered in yellow-buff fur, and weigh an average of 480 g (17 oz). Around one year of age, the fur in both sexes changes to a black colour, with pale cheek patches, with the sexually dimorphic adult coats only growing when they reach four or five years. During this period, the juveniles sing the female form of call, and regularly engage in play behaviour.

Northern white-cheeked gibbons reach sexual maturity at seven or eight years, and have lived for at least 28 years in the wild.
