= Gabrielle Maud Vassal =

British naturalist (1880–1959)

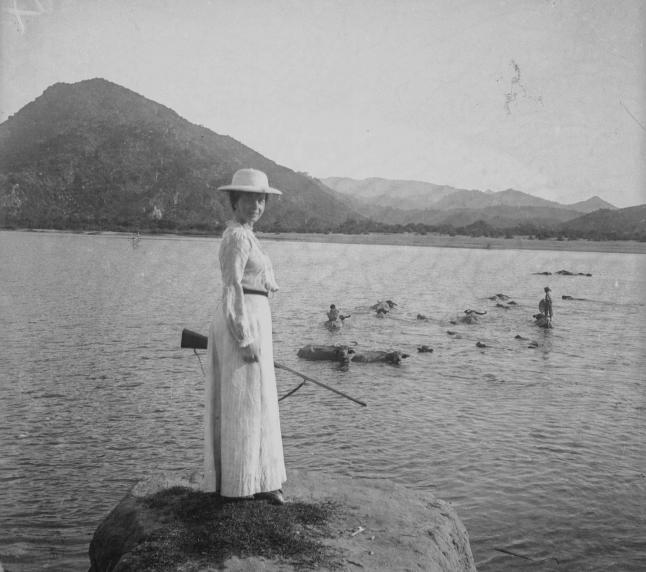
- 1904-1908
- Born: Gabrielle Maud Candler; 5 March 1880; Uppingham, England
- Died: 31 May 1959 (aged 79)
- Occupation: Naturalist
- Spouse: Joseph Marguerite Jean-Baptiste Vassal

Gabrielle Maud Vassal (née Candler 5 March 1880 – 31 May 1959) was a British-born naturalist.

== Background ==
Born in Uppingham in Rutland, England. In 1901 the family moved to Hampstead in London, where she married Joseph Marguerite Jean-Baptiste Vassal, a physician in the French Colonial Service, in 1903. The newlywed couple then moved to Vietnam in 1904 and later went to French colonies in Africa.

Vassal was a keen naturalist and supplied numerous specimens from Vietnam, Gabon and Congo to the Natural History Museum in London for a period of 30 years. She was considered an unusual collector, first because she was female, and second because she was "operating in French territory and sending specimens to a British museum." Many of her letters to the museum are still preserved in their archives. Her specimens included several newly discovered species, and a number were named after her, including the yellow-cheeked crested gibbon Nomascus gabriellae.

After the outbreak of World War II, the Vassals returned to France and Gabrielle joined the French Resistance. She helped downed airmen escape and earned recognition by governments in both Britain and the United States.

Vassal became known as a successful photographer, author and public speaker.

A portrait of Vassal was taken in 1928 and originally owned by Pinewood Studios, then donated to Victoria and Albert Museum in 1989, and is now held in the National Portrait Gallery in London.

== Selected works ==
Vassal authored several books, including a novel titled A Romance of the Western Front published in 1918, On & Off Duty in Annam, In and round Yunnan Fou about her time in Vietnam, Life In French Congo in 1925 and Three Years In Vietnam 1907-1910: Medicine, Chams And Tribesmen In Nhatrang And Surroundings in 1910.
