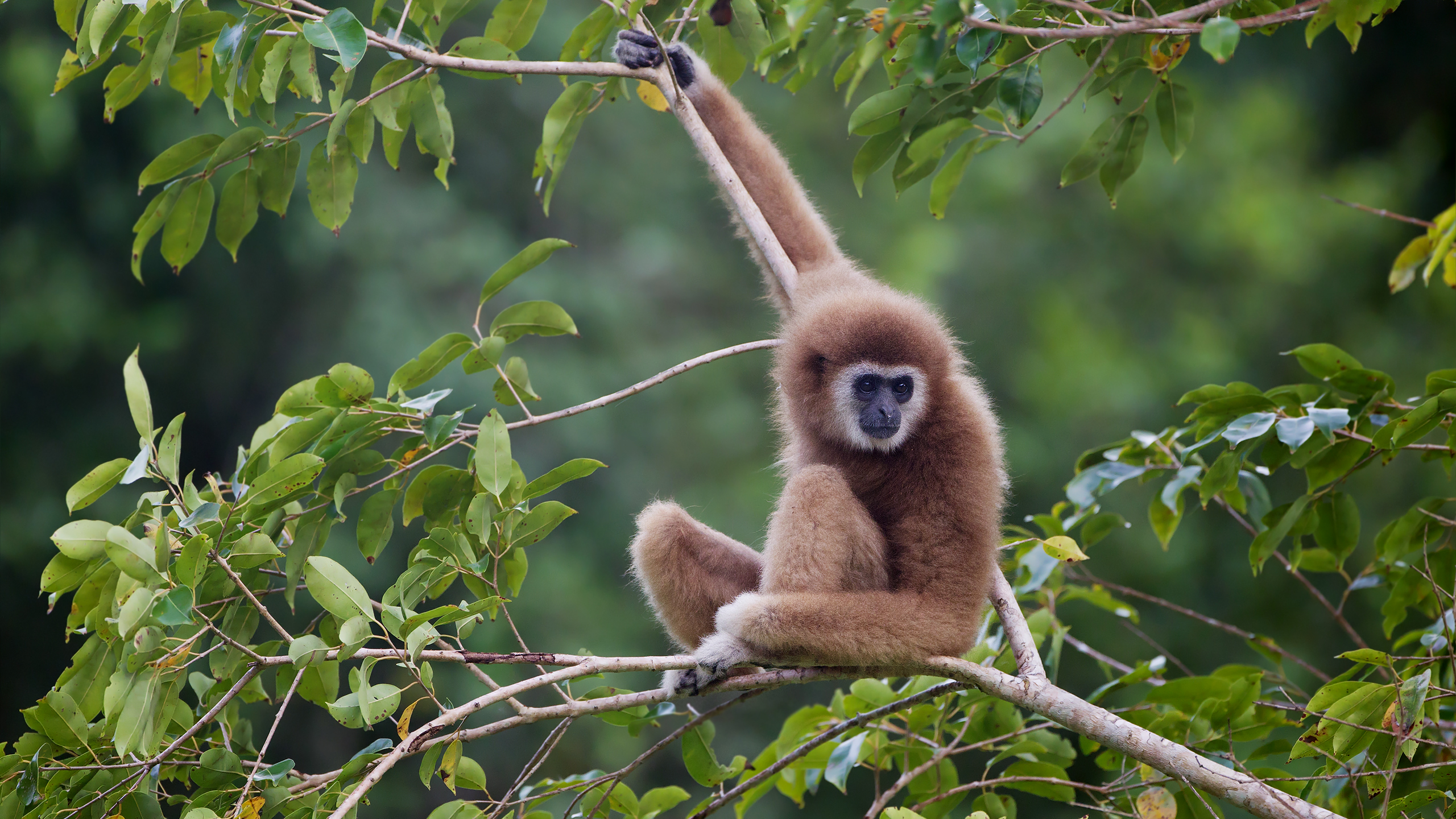
- A lar gibbon (Hylobates lar)

Conservation status
- CITES Appendix I

Scientific classification
- Kingdom: Animalia
- Phylum: Chordata
- Class: Mammalia
- Order: Primates
- Parvorder: Catarrhini
- Superfamily: Hominoidea
- Family: Hylobatidae; Gray, 1870

Type genus
- Hylobates Illiger, 1811

Genera
- Hylobates; Hoolock; Nomascus; Symphalangus; †Bunopithecus; †Yuanmoupithecus
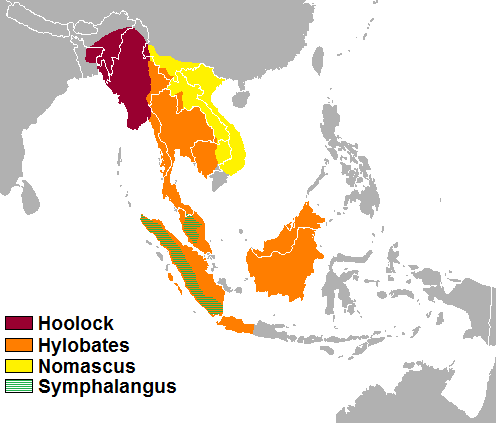
- Distribution in Southeast Asia

= Gibbon =

Gibbons Temporal range: 13.8–0 Ma Late Miocene–recent

Family of apes

Gibbon Rehabilitation Project, 2013

Gibbons (/ˈɡɪbənz/) are apes in the family Hylobatidae (/ˌhaɪləˈbætɪdiː/; hylobatids). The family historically contained one genus, but now is split into four extant genera and 20 species. Gibbons live in subtropical and tropical forests from eastern Bangladesh and Northeast India to Southeast Asia and Indonesia (including the islands of Sumatra, Borneo and Java).

Also called the lesser apes, gibbons differ from the great apes (chimpanzees, gorillas, orangutans and humans) in being smaller, exhibiting low sexual dimorphism, and not making nests. Like all of the apes, gibbons are tailless. Unlike most of the great apes, gibbons frequently form long-term pair bonds. Their primary mode of locomotion, brachiation, involves swinging from branch to branch for distances up to 15 m (50 ft), at speeds as fast as 55 km/h (34 mph). They can also make leaps up to 8 m (26 ft), and walk bipedally with their arms raised for balance. They are the fastest of all tree-dwelling, nonflying mammals.

Depending on the species and sex, gibbons' fur coloration varies from dark- to light-brown shades, and any shade between black and white, though a completely "white" gibbon is rare.

== Etymology ==
The English word "gibbon" is a reborrowing from French and may originally derive from an Orang Asli word.

== Evolutionary history ==
Whole genome molecular dating analyses indicate that the gibbon lineage diverged from that of great apes around 16.8 million years ago (Mya) (95% confidence interval: 15.9–17.6 Mya; given a divergence of 29 Mya from Old World monkeys). Adaptive divergence associated with chromosomal rearrangements led to rapid radiation of the four genera 5–7 Mya. Each genus comprises a distinct, well-delineated lineage, but the sequence and timing of divergences among these genera has been hard to resolve, even with whole genome data, due to radiative speciations and extensive incomplete lineage sorting. An analysis based on morphology suggests that the four genera are ordered as (Symphalangus, (Nomascus, (Hoolock, Hylobates))).

- Hominoidea (hominoids, apes)
  - Hylobatidae
    - (gibbons)
      - Symphalangus
      - - Nomascus
        - - Hoolock
          - Hylobates
  - Hominidae (hominids, great apes)
    - Ponginae
      - (orangutans)
    - Homininae
      - Gorillini
        - (gorillas)
      - Hominini
        - Panina
          - (bonobos and chimpanzees)
        - Hominina
          - (humans)

A coalescent-based species tree analysis of genome-scale datasets suggests a phylogeny for the four genera ordered as (Hylobates, (Nomascus, (Hoolock, Symphalangus))).

- Hominoidea (hominoids, apes)
  - Hylobatidae
    - (gibbons)
      - Hylobates
      - - Nomascus
        - - Hoolock
          - Symphalangus
  - Hominidae (hominids, great apes)
    - Ponginae
      - (orangutans)
    - Homininae
      - Gorillini
        - (gorillas)
      - Hominini
        - Panina
          - (bonobos and chimpanzees)
        - Hominina
          - (humans)

At the species level, estimates from mitochondrial DNA genome analyses suggest that Hylobates pileatus diverged from H. lar and H. agilis around 3.9 Mya, and H. lar and H. agilis separated around 3.3 Mya. Whole genome analysis suggests divergence of H. pileatus from H. moloch 1.5–3.0 Mya. The extinct Bunopithecus sericus is a gibbon or gibbon-like ape, which until recently, was thought to be closely related to the hoolock gibbons.

== Taxonomy ==
Hominoid family tree

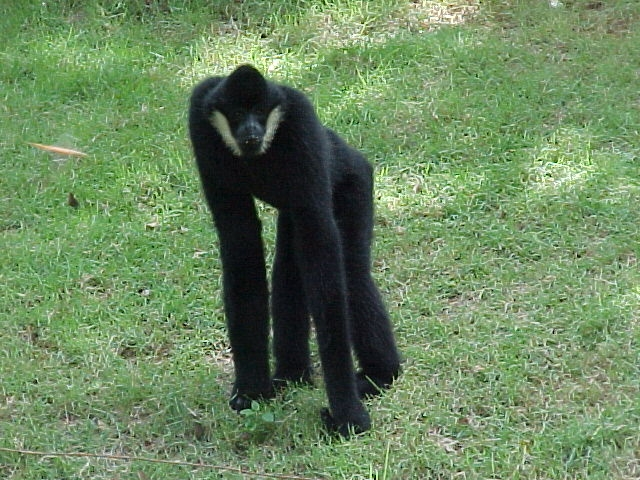
Northern white-cheeked gibbon, Nomascus leucogenys

The family is divided into four genera based on their diploid chromosome number: Hylobates (44), Hoolock (38), Nomascus (52), and Symphalangus (50). Also, three extinct genera currently are recognised: Bunopithecus, Junzi, and Yuanmoupithecus.

Family Hylobatidae: gibbons

- Genus Hoolock
  - Western hoolock gibbon, H. hoolock
  - Eastern hoolock gibbon, H. leuconedys
  - Skywalker hoolock gibbon, H. tianxing
- Genus Hylobates: dwarf gibbons
  - Lar gibbon or white-handed gibbon, H. lar
  - Bornean white-bearded gibbon, H. albibarbis
  - Agile gibbon or black-handed gibbon, H. agilis
  - Western grey gibbon or Abbott's grey gibbon, H. abbotti
  - Eastern grey gibbon or northern grey gibbon, H. funereus
  - Müller's gibbon or southern grey gibbon, H. muelleri
  - Silvery gibbon, H. moloch
  - Pileated gibbon or capped gibbon, H. pileatus
  - Kloss's gibbon, Mentawai gibbon or bilou, H. klossii
- Genus Symphalangus
  - Siamang, S. syndactylus
- Genus Nomascus: crested gibbons
  - Northern buffed-cheeked gibbon, N. annamensis
  - Concolor or black crested gibbon, N. concolor
  - Eastern black crested gibbon or Cao Vit black crested gibbon, N. nasutus
  - Hainan black crested gibbon, N. hainanus
  - †Imperial gibbon, N. imperialis
  - Northern white-cheeked gibbon, N. leucogenys
  - Southern white-cheeked gibbon, N. siki
  - Yellow-cheeked gibbon, N. gabriellae

=== Extinct genera ===
- Genus Bunopithecus
  - Bunopithecus sericus
- Genus Yuanmoupithecus
  - Yuanmoupithecus xiaoyuan

=== Hybrids ===
Many gibbons are hard to identify based on fur coloration, so are identified either by song or genetics. These morphological ambiguities have led to hybrids in zoos. Zoos often receive gibbons of unknown origin, so they rely on morphological variation or labels that are impossible to verify to assign species and subspecies names, so separate species of gibbons commonly are misidentified and housed together. Interspecific hybrids, within a genus, are also suspected to occur in wild gibbons where their ranges overlap. No records exist, however, of fertile hybrids between different gibbon genera, either in the wild or in captivity.

== Description ==
Gibbon arm skeleton (left) compared to average human male arm bone structure (right): Scapula (red), humerus (orange), ulna (yellow), and radius (blue) are shown in both structures.

One characteristic aspect of a gibbon's anatomy is the wrist, which functions something like a ball-and-socket joint, allowing for biaxial movement. This greatly reduces the amount of energy needed in the upper arm and torso, while also reducing stress on the shoulder joint. Gibbons also have long hands and feet, with a deep cleft between the first and second digits of their hands. Their fur is usually black, gray, or brownish, often with white markings on hands, feet and face. Some species, such as the siamang, have an enlarged throat sac, which inflates and serves as a resonating chamber when the animals call. This structure can become quite large in some species, sometimes equaling the size of the animal's head. Their voices are much more powerful than that of any human singer, although they are at best half a human's height.

Gibbon skulls and teeth resemble those of the great apes, and their noses are similar to those of all catarrhine primates. The dental formula is 2.1.2.32.1.2.3. The siamang, which is the largest of the 18 species, is distinguished by having two fingers on each foot stuck together, hence the generic and species names Symphalangus and syndactylus.

== Behavior ==
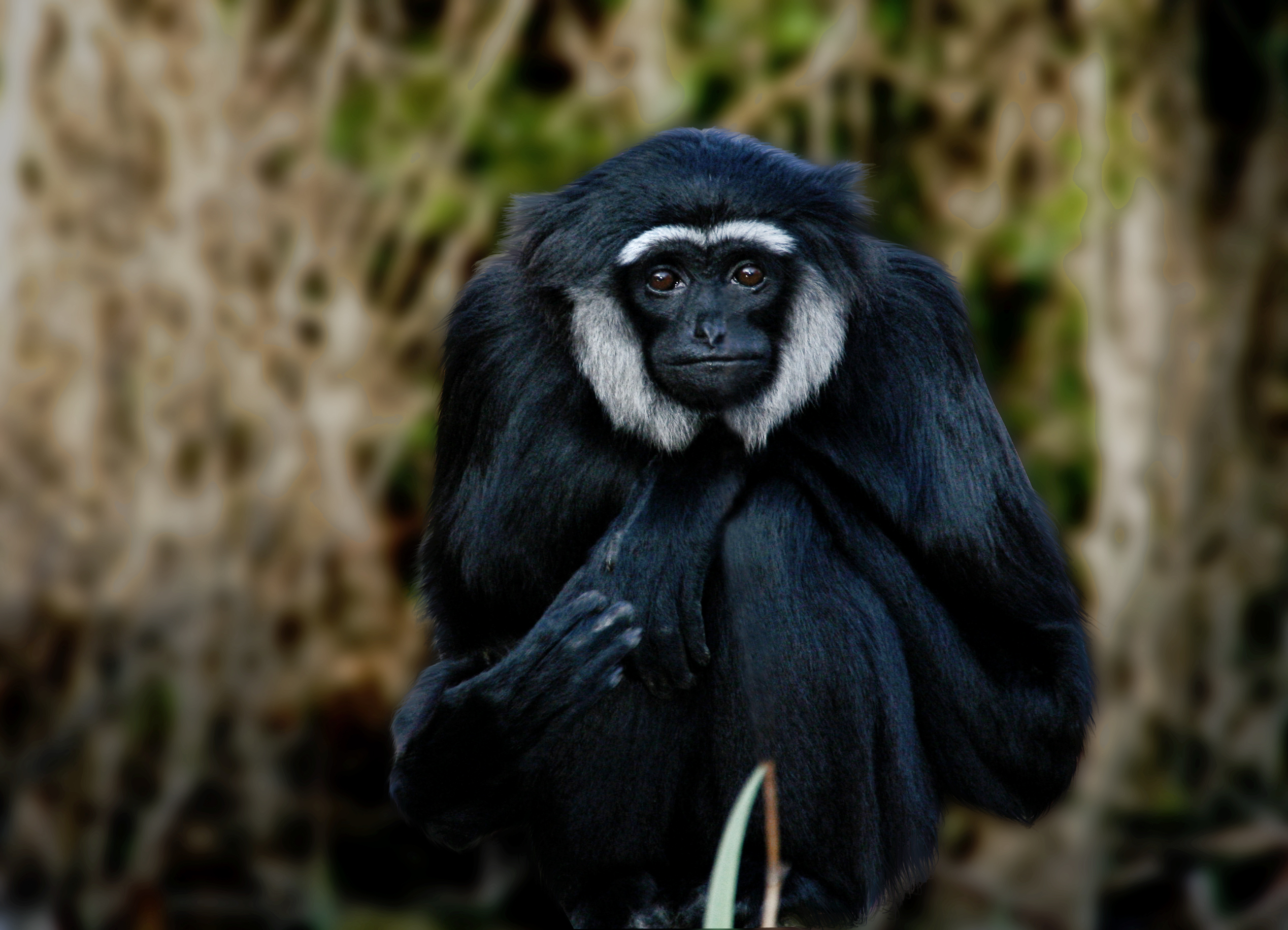
Agile gibbon, Hylobates agilis

Like all primates, gibbons are social animals. They are strongly territorial, and defend their boundaries with vigorous visual and vocal displays. The vocal element, which can often be heard for distances up to 1 km (0.62 mi), consists of a duet between a mated pair, with their young sometimes joining in. In most species, males and some females sing solos to attract mates, as well as advertise their territories. The song can be used to identify not only which species of gibbon is singing, but also the area from which it comes.

Gibbons often retain the same mate for life, although they do not always remain sexually monogamous. In addition to extra-pair copulations, pair-bonded gibbons occasionally "divorce". About 10% of gibbon groups studied in the wild contained more than two adults. In these cases, the limitation of food availability on group size may be relaxed, allowing more adults to congregate together without a significant increase in competition.

Gibbons are among nature's best brachiators. Their ball-and-socket wrist joints allow them unmatched speed and accuracy when swinging through trees. Nonetheless, their mode of transportation can lead to hazards when a branch breaks or a hand slips, and researchers estimate that the majority of gibbons suffer bone fractures one or more times during their lifetimes. They are the fastest of all tree-dwelling, nonflying mammals. On the ground, gibbons tend to walk bipedally, and their Achilles tendon morphology is more similar to that of humans than that of any other ape.

== Diet ==
Gibbons' diets are about 60% fruit-based, but they also consume twigs, leaves, insects, flowers, and occasionally birds' eggs. Levels of frugivory vary between populations and species of gibbons and are best predicted by local fruit availability. The most folivorous gibbon species come from the genus Nomascus, whose higher reliance on leaves is thought to be because they live in high altitude seasonal habitats that lack year-round abundant fruits. Long-term field studies by David Chivers in Bornean rainforests revealed gibbons' strong seasonal preference for non-fig fruits, informing reintroduction and habitat protection efforts for lesser apes.

== Genetics ==
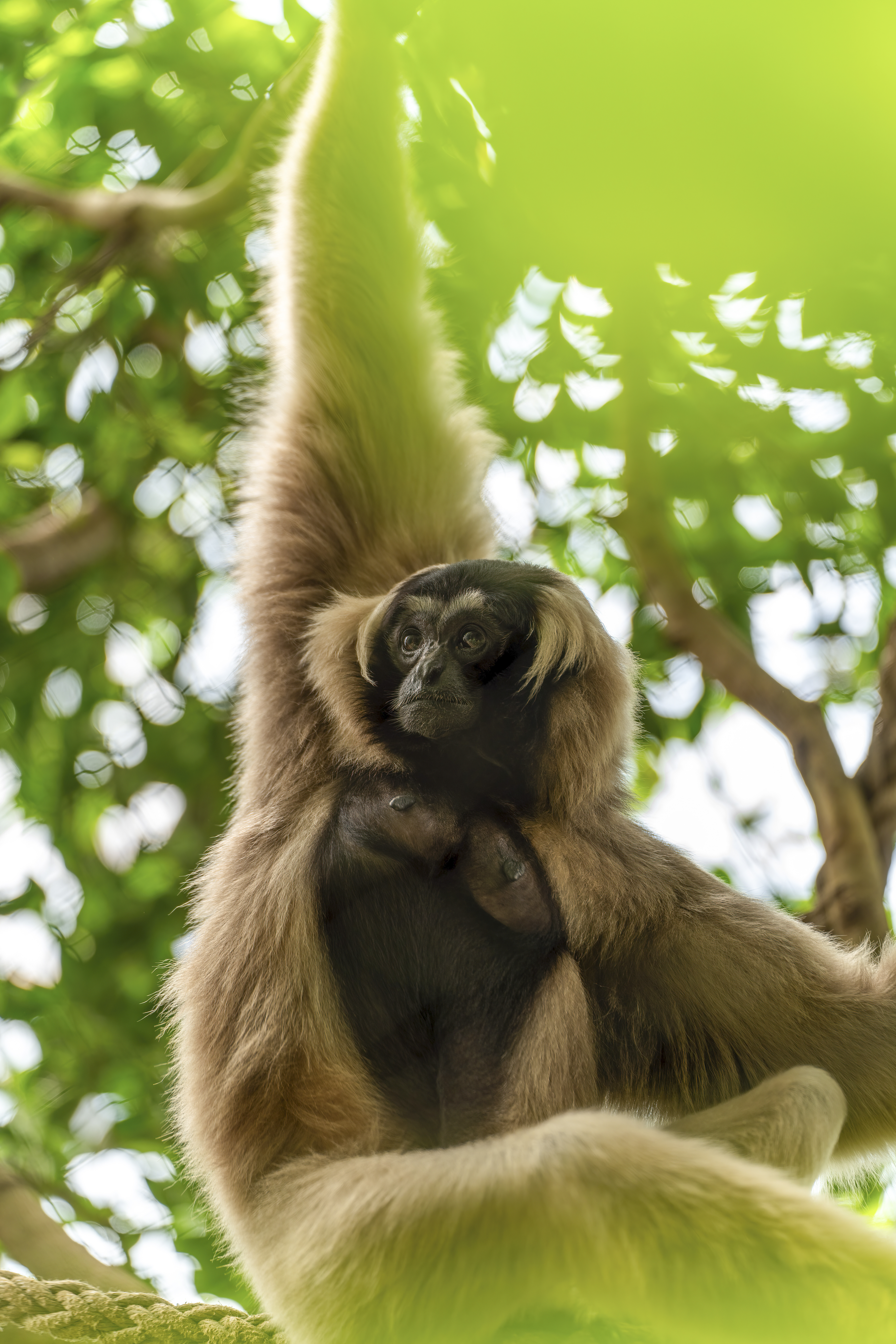
Pileated gibbon (Hylobates pileatus)

Gibbons were the first apes to diverge from the common ancestor of humans and other great apes about 16.8 Mya. With a genome that has a 96% similarity to humans, the gibbon has a role as a bridge between Old World monkeys, such as macaques, and the great apes. According to a study that mapped synteny (genes occurring on the same chromosome) disruptions in the gibbon and human genome, humans and other great apes are part of the same superfamily (Hominoidea) with gibbons. The karyotype of gibbons, however, diverged in a much more rapid fashion from the common hominoid ancestor than other apes.

The common ancestor of hominoids is shown to have a minimum of 24 major chromosomal rearrangements from the presumed gibbon ancestor's karyotype. Reaching the common gibbon ancestor's karyotype from today's various living species of gibbons will require up to 28 additional rearrangements. Adding up, this implies that at least 52 major chromosomal rearrangements are needed to compare the common hominoid ancestor to today's gibbons. No common specific sequence element in the independent rearrangements was found, while 46% of the gibbon-human synteny breakpoints occur in segmental duplication regions. This is an indication that these major differences in humans and gibbons could have had a common source of plasticity or change. Researchers view this unusually high rate of chromosomal rearrangement that is specific in small apes such as gibbons could potentially be due to factors that increase the rate of chromosomal breakage or factors that allow derivative chromosomes to be fixed in a homozygous state while mostly lost in other mammals.

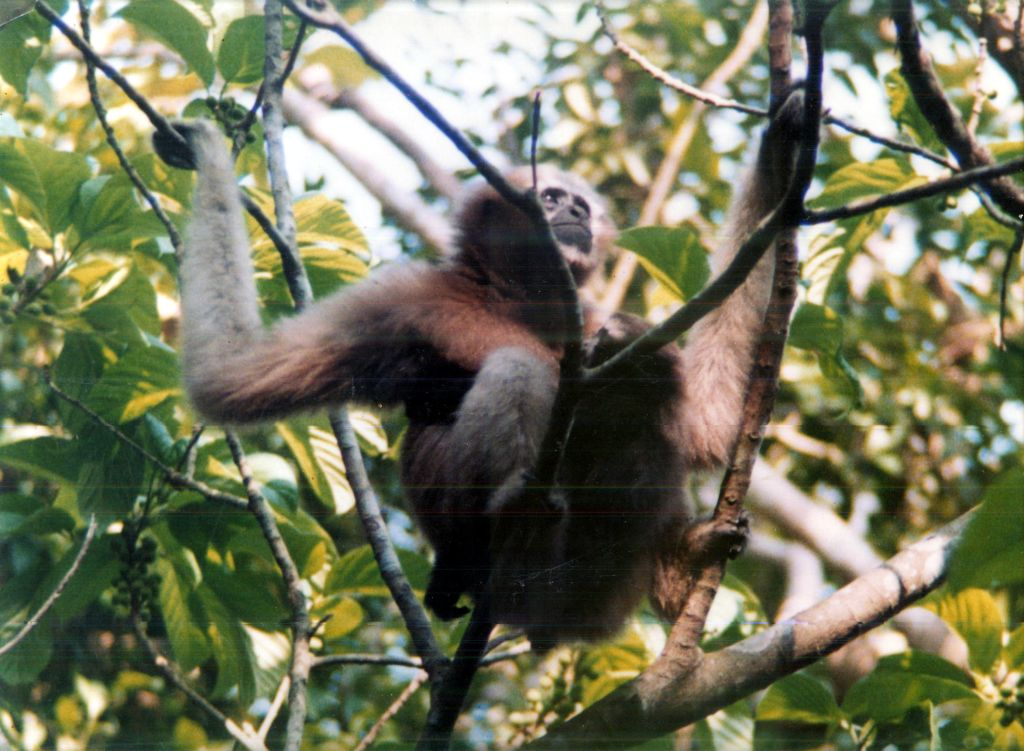
Genus Hoolock

The whole genome of the gibbons in Southeast Asia was first sequenced in 2014 by the German Primate Center, including Christian Roos, Markus Brameier, and Lutz Walter, along with other international researchers. One of the gibbons that had its genome sequenced is a white-cheeked gibbon (Nomascus leucogenys, NLE) named Asia. The team found that a jumping DNA element named LAVA transposon (also called gibbon-specific retrotransposon) is unique to the gibbon genome apart from humans and the great apes. The LAVA transposon increases mutation rate, thus is supposed to have contributed to the rapid and greater change in gibbons in comparison to their close relatives, which is critical for evolutionary development. The very high rate of chromosomal disorder and rearrangements (such as duplications, deletions or inversions of large stretches of DNA) due to the moving of this large DNA segment is one of the key features that are unique to the gibbon genome.

A special feature of the LAVA transposon is that it positioned itself precisely between genes that are involved in chromosome segregation and distribution during cell division, which results in a premature termination state leading to an alteration in transcription. This incorporation of the jumping gene near genes involved in chromosome replication is thought to make the rearrangement in the genome even more likely, leading to a greater diversity within the gibbon genera.

In addition, some characteristic genes in the gibbon genome had gone through a positive selection and are suggested to give rise to specific anatomical features for gibbons to adapt to their new environment. One of them is TBX5, which is a gene that is required for the development of the front extremities or forelimbs such as long arms. The other is COL1A1, which is responsible for the development of collagen, a protein that is directly involved with the forming of connective tissues, bone, and cartilage. This gene is thought to have a role in gibbons' stronger muscles.

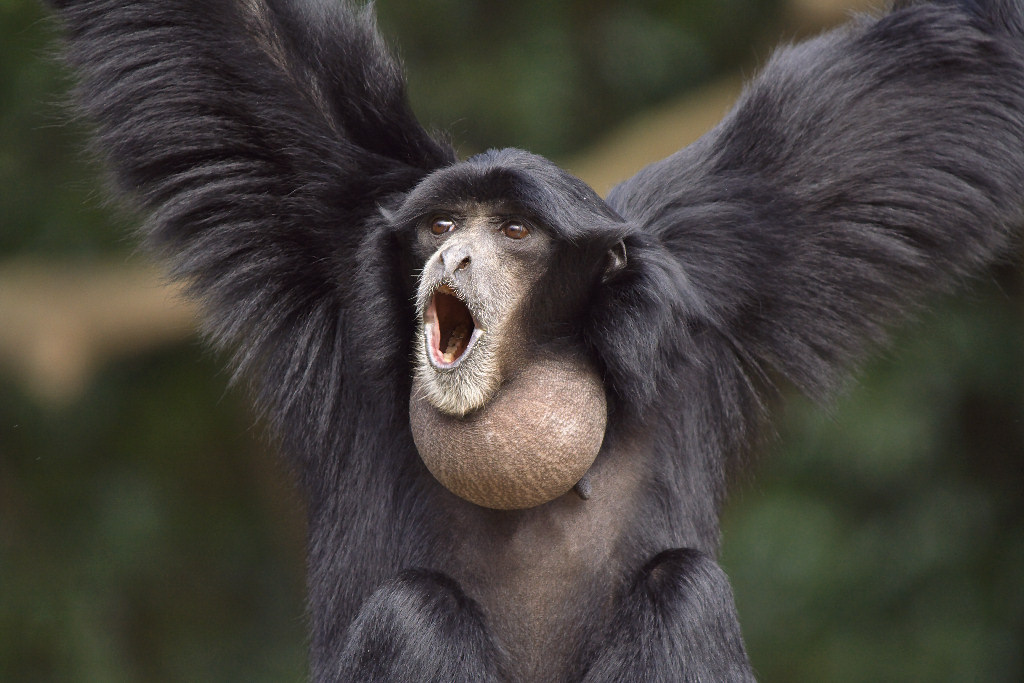
Siamang, Symphalangus syndactylus

Researchers have found a coincidence between major environmental changes in Southeast Asia about 5 Mya that caused a cyclical dynamic of expansions and contractions of their forest habitat, an instance of radiation experienced by the gibbon genera. This may have led to the development of a suite of physical characteristics, distinct from their great ape relatives, to adapt to their habitat of dense, canopy forest.

These crucial findings in genetics have contributed to the use of gibbons as a genetic model for chromosome breakage and fusion, which is a type of translocation mutation. The unusually high number of structural changes in the DNA and chromosomal rearrangements could lead to problematic consequences in some species. Gibbons, however, not only seemed to be free from problems but let the change help them effectively adapt to their environment. Thus, gibbons are organisms on which genetics research could be focused to broaden the implications to human diseases related to chromosomal changes, such as cancer, including chronic myeloid leukemia.

== Conservation status ==
Most species are either endangered or critically endangered (the sole exception being H. leuconedys, which is vulnerable), primarily due to degradation or loss of their forest habitats. On the island of Phuket in Thailand, a volunteer-based Gibbon Rehabilitation Center rescues gibbons that were kept in captivity, and are being released back into the wild. The Kalaweit Project also has gibbon rehabilitation centers on Borneo and Sumatra.

The IUCN Species Survival Commission Primate Specialist Group announced 2015 to be the Year of the Gibbon and initiated events to be held around the world in zoos to promote awareness of the status of gibbons.

== In traditional Chinese culture ==
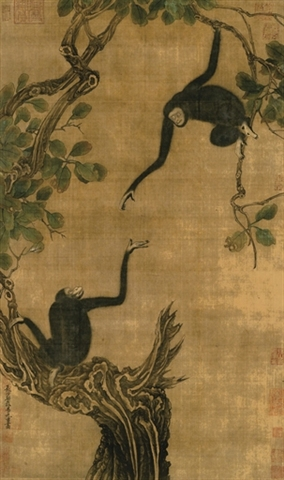
Two gibbons in an oak tree by the Song dynasty painter Yì Yuánjí

Sinologist Robert van Gulik concluded gibbons were widespread in central and southern China until at least the Song dynasty, and furthermore, based on an analysis of references to primates in Chinese poetry and other literature and their portrayal in Chinese paintings, the Chinese word yuán (猿) referred specifically to gibbons until they were extirpated throughout most of the country due to habitat destruction (around the 14th century). In modern usage, however, yuán is a generic word for ape. Early Chinese writers viewed the "noble" gibbons, gracefully moving high in the treetops, as the "gentlemen" (jūnzǐ, 君子) of the forest, in contrast to the greedy macaques, attracted by human food. The Taoists ascribed occult properties to gibbons, believing them to be able to live for several hundred years and to turn into humans.

Gibbon figurines as old as from the fourth to third centuries BCE (the Zhou dynasty) have been found in China. Later on, gibbons became a popular subject for Chinese painters, especially during the Song dynasty and early Yuan dynasty, when Yì Yuánjí and Mùqī Fǎcháng excelled in painting these apes. From Chinese cultural influence, the Zen motif of the "gibbon grasping at the reflection of the moon in the water" became popular in Japanese art, as well, though gibbons have never occurred naturally in Japan.
