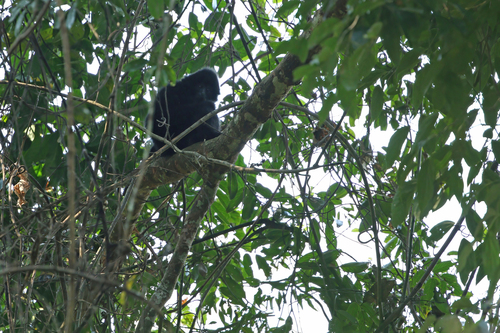

Conservation status
- Critically Endangered (IUCN 3.1)
- CITES Appendix I

Scientific classification
- Kingdom: Animalia
- Phylum: Chordata
- Class: Mammalia
- Infraclass: Placentalia
- Order: Primates
- Superfamily: Hominoidea
- Family: Hylobatidae
- Genus: Nomascus
- Species: N. concolor

Binomial name
- Nomascus concolor (Harlan, 1826)

Subspecies
- Nomascus concolor concolor; Nomascus concolor lu; Nomascus concolor jingdongensis; Nomascus concolor furvogaster
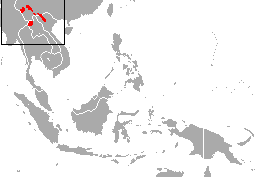
- Black crested gibbon range

Synonyms
- Hylobates concolor (Harlan, 1826); Hylobates harlani Lesson, 1827; Hylobates niger Ogilby, 1840; Nomascus harlani Lesson, 1827; Nomascus henrici de Pousargues, 1897; Nomascus niger Ogilby, 1840; Simia concolor Harlan, 1826

= Black crested gibbon =

Black crested gibbon Temporal range: Pleistocene to Recent

Species of ape

The black crested gibbon (Nomascus concolor) is a critically endangered species of gibbon found in China, Laos, and northern Vietnam, with four subspecies.

== Taxonomy ==
The taxonomy of the species is confused. Previously grouped in the genus Hylobates, currently four subspecies are recognized.

- Central Yunnan black crested gibbon (Nomascus concolor jingdongensis), Yunnan province, China
- West Yunnan black crested gibbon (N. c. furvogaster), Yunnan province, China
- Laotian black crested gibbon (N. c. lu), Laos
- Tonkin black crested gibbon (N. c. concolor), northern Vietnam, Yunnan province, China.

== Description ==
The length from the head to the end of body is 43–54 cm (17–21 in) and it weighs from 6.9 to 10 kg (15 to 22 lb). The species exhibits sexual dichromatism, the male is completely black, while the female is a golden or buff colour with variable black patches, including a black streak on the head.

== Diet ==
The black crested gibbon mainly eats fruits from a variety of plant species. It also feeds on flowers, leaves, and buds at increased rates during months when fruit is not available. On rare occasions, it will eat fungi, insects, bird eggs and young, and small mammals such as flying squirrels.

== Behavior ==
Gibbons are arboreal primates that travel mainly by brachiation, which means they use their elongated arms to swing from an overhead branch or support. Gibbons also utilize other forms of locomotion such as bipedal walking, climbing, leaping, and diving. They prefer to rest in taller, thicker trees with high coverage, most likely to avoid detection by predators. Although they are territorial, gibbons are less aggressive than the great apes, potentially due to living in smaller groups.

=== Group living ===
The black crested gibbon lives arboreally in small groups, most of which consist of a pair of adults, one male and one female, and their offspring. It has been observed that some groups consist of one adult male living with two to four females and their offspring. The group could potentially include one infant, one juvenile, one adolescent, and one sub adult. Groups have been found to be territorial, like other species of gibbons. Territories are limited by the availability of the male for territory defense. Thus, group and territory size would be limited. With a large group, territory defense would not be favored by kin selection due to the group consisting of less-closely related individuals. Though the research is not explicit, there can be some assumptions made about altruism within groups. Since the majority of groups are living in monogamous relationships with both males and females displaying aggression when another individual enters, it is likely that kin selection plays a major role in determining behavior of the group. Kin recognition is thought to be favored for maternal-offspring relationships. This is largely due to primates' uncertainty over paternity, even in pair-bonding species due to female promiscuity. Social behaviors within groups will evolve according to Hamilton's rule.

=== Social organization and mating ===
Previous research suggested that the black crested gibbon lives in family groups consisting of a monogamous pair and their offspring, but it has also been observed to live in polygynous social units. In polygynous groups, the black crested gibbon has been observed partaking in both intra-group and extra-group copulation. Males and females both defend territory and initiate mating behaviors, suggesting that neither sex dominates the other. This is further supported by the observations of multi-male and multi-female social units. Females determine their choice of mate, which creates hierarchical relationships between males in multi-male groups.

There may be various selection pressures for polygyny within previously monogamous groups. Parents tend to be hostile towards maturing offspring, with males leaving the group more quickly than females do. Yet, upon tolerance by the mother, adult female offspring may remain in the group, as the group continues to forage and feed as family members. The mutual tolerance of females is likely to be caused by "weak territoriality of females". Further selection occurs due to the birth interval for a single female averaging 2–2.5 years. Male fitness would benefit from inseminating other females during a birth interval. This hypothesis is supported by the large scrotal size allowing for increased sperm production. Other observations have been made that males will share child carrying to place less of a burden on the female, delaying her interbirth time. Habitat can also affect the mating behavior of gibbons. In large habitats with scarce resources, a larger, polygynous group is more ideal for defending territory despite the sharing of resources. The conflicting observations support the hypothesis that the black-crested gibbon demonstrates both monogamous and polygamous sexual relationships.

=== Singing ===
As with all gibbon species, the black crested gibbon partakes in loud bouts of singing that are initiated by the male, often in duets or trios. The vocalization patterns are flexible and vary between species, with species that are more geographically and phylogenetically similar having more similar songs. The songs are performed in duets or trios, in areas that promote sound transmission, such as emergent trees or near ridges. They are used as a means of communication between groups to defend access to resources, space out territory, guard mates, and strengthen cohesion within the group, including pairbonding. Stronger, more coordinated and complex duets are a display of a mated pair's bond, and subsequently make the pair less attractive to other potential mates, which deters extra-group copulation. Other subadult members of a group may join in the song syncronous with one another. The black crested gibbon in particular is known for its coordinated, sex-specific songs that strengthen pairbonding and hierarchical relationships.

== Distribution and habitat ==
The black crested gibbon has a discontinuous distribution across southwestern China, northwestern Laos, and northern Vietnam. One thousand years ago, gibbons which may have been crested gibbons (Nomascus) were found over a large part of southern and central China up to the Yellow River.

The four subspecies are geographically separated. The Tonkin black crested gibbon (Nomascus concolor concolor) occurs in southern China (southwestern Yunnan) and northern Vietnam (Lào Cai, Yên Bái, Sơn La, and Lai Châu provinces), between the Black and Red Rivers. The West Yunnan black crested gibbon (N. c. furvogaster) occurs in a small area near the Burma border, west of the Mekong, in southwestern Yunnan, southern China. The Central Yunnan black crested gibbon (N. c. jingdongensis) occurs in a small region around the Wuliang Mountains, between the Mekong and Chuanhe rivers in west-central Yunnan. The Laotian black crested gibbon (N. c. lu) occurs in northwestern Laos in an isolated population on the east bank of the Mekong in Laos.

The black crested gibbon inhabits tropical evergreen, semievergreen, deciduous forests in subtropical and mountainous areas. It generally lives in high altitudes, from 2100 to 2400 m above sea level, where most of their food resources are concentrated. In Vietnam and Laos, the species is found at lower altitudes, while in China, it has been observed as high as 2689 meters.

== Conservation ==
The black crested gibbon is listed as critically endangered on the IUCN Red List. An estimated 1300 to 2000 individuals are left in the wild. The western black crested gibbons were included on the State Forestry Bureau of China's list of 12 flagship and keystone species for biodiversity protection in 2021. While under protection, there was still a noticeable decline in population size at Wuliangshan National Nature Reserve. It was discovered that the gray langurs are suppressing the black crested gibbon's potential recovery. The gray langurs and black crested gibbons have similar diets and ranges; however, gray langurs have an advantage by having a more comprehensive dietary list, a larger group, and faster life history. The black crested gibbon inhabits the evergreen broad-leaved forests that take a long time to regenerate, making it challenging for the gibbons to connect with other groups. Ecological corridors were put in place in the Hengduan Mountain in China to help restore connections between different groups, increase overall well-being, and decrease the risk of extinction.
