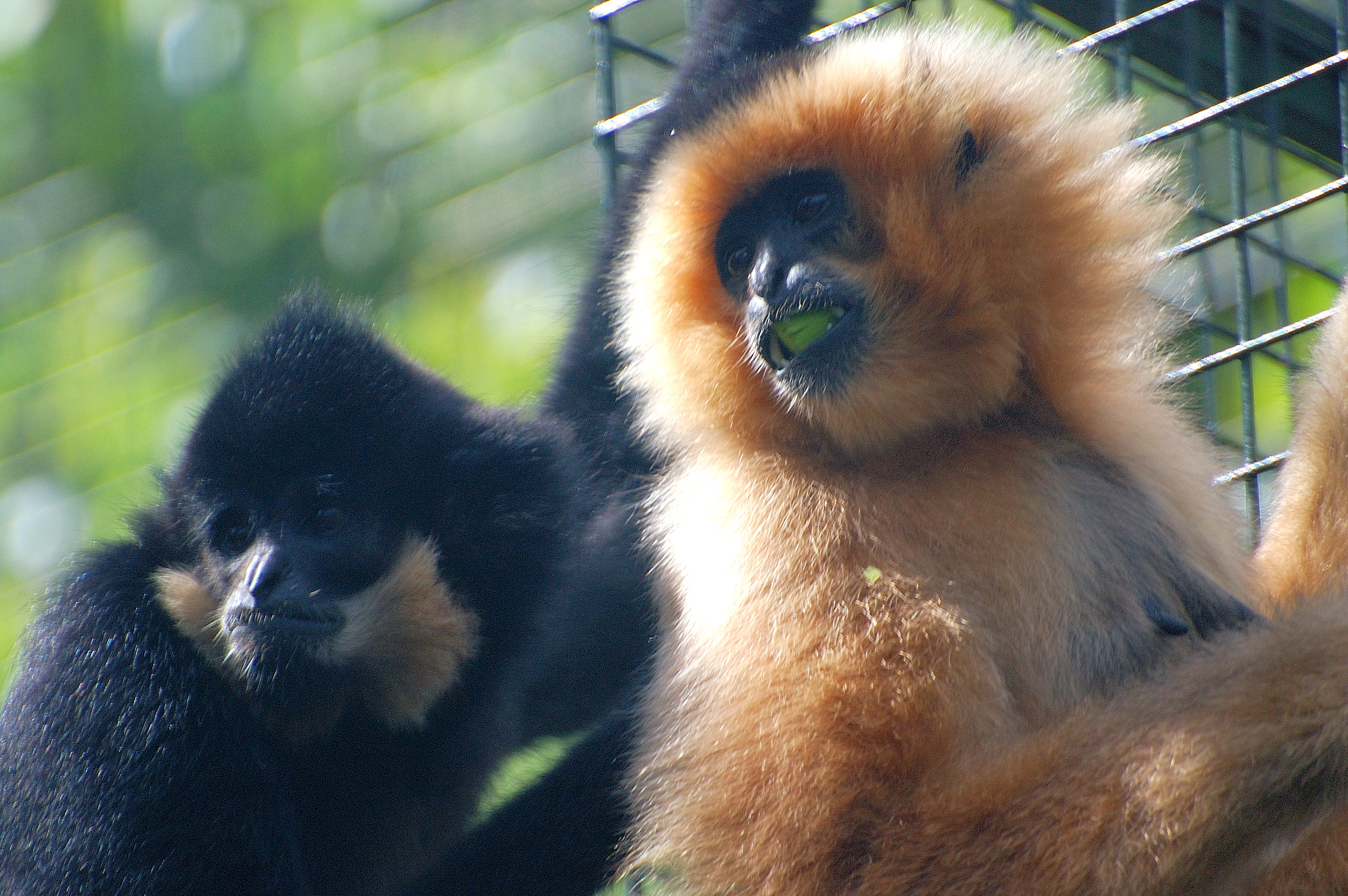
- (Male left; female right) at Edinburgh Zoo

Conservation status
- Endangered (IUCN 3.1)
- CITES Appendix I

Scientific classification
- Kingdom: Animalia
- Phylum: Chordata
- Class: Mammalia
- Infraclass: Placentalia
- Order: Primates
- Superfamily: Hominoidea
- Family: Hylobatidae
- Genus: Nomascus
- Species: N. gabriellae

Binomial name
- Nomascus gabriellae (Thomas, 1909)
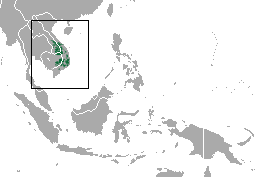
- Yellow-cheeked gibbon range

= Yellow-cheeked gibbon =

Species of Old World ape

The yellow-cheeked gibbon (Nomascus gabriellae), also called the golden-cheeked gibbon, the yellow-cheeked crested gibbon, the golden-cheeked crested gibbon, the red-cheeked gibbon, or the buffed-cheeked gibbon, is a species of gibbon native to Vietnam, Laos, and Cambodia. The species was discovered and named after the British naturalist Gabrielle Maud Vassal.

The yellow-cheeked gibbon is born blond and later turns black. Males carry this colouring through their lifespan and have the distinguishing golden cheeks. Females are born blonde to blend into their mother's fur but they later turn black. Females turn back to blond at sexual maturity, keeping only a black cap on the top of their heads.

This diurnal and arboreal gibbon lives in primary tropical forest, foraging for fruits, using brachiation to move through the trees.

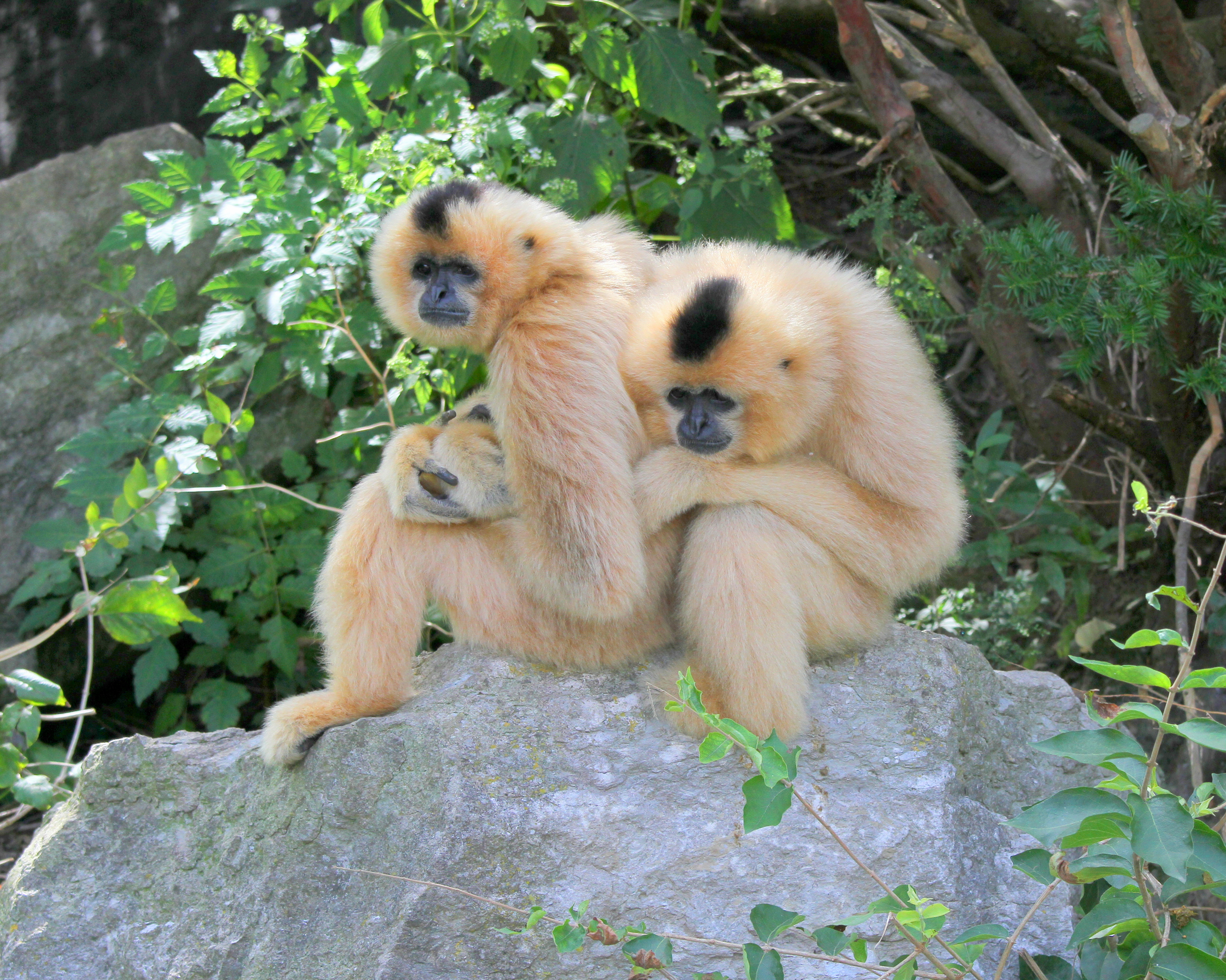
Female adults at the Cincinnati Zoo

Little is known about this species in the wild, but it is thought that it has a life span of approximately 46 years.

Gibbon groups vocalise loudly early in the morning. Their songs probably serve to defend resources such as territories, food trees, partners, but may also help to attract potential mates. Duetting occurs between mated pairs, the song is coordinated and contains sex-specific phrases.

== Conservation and rehabilitation ==
The largest known population of this species is found in Cambodia's Keo Seima Wildlife Sanctuary, estimated at 1432 individuals in 2020. The population appears to be stable over the last decade. There are several conservation programs active at the site, including protected area management supported by Wildlife Conservation Society and a community ecotourism project centered on habituated gibbons. A large protected wild population can be found in Cat Tien National Park: where a collaboration with the Endangered Asian Species Trust (UK), and Pingtung Wildlife Rescue Centre (Taiwan) founded the Dao Tien Endangered Primate Species Centre, which specialises on the rescue, rehabilitation and release of N. gabriellae and other endangered primates.

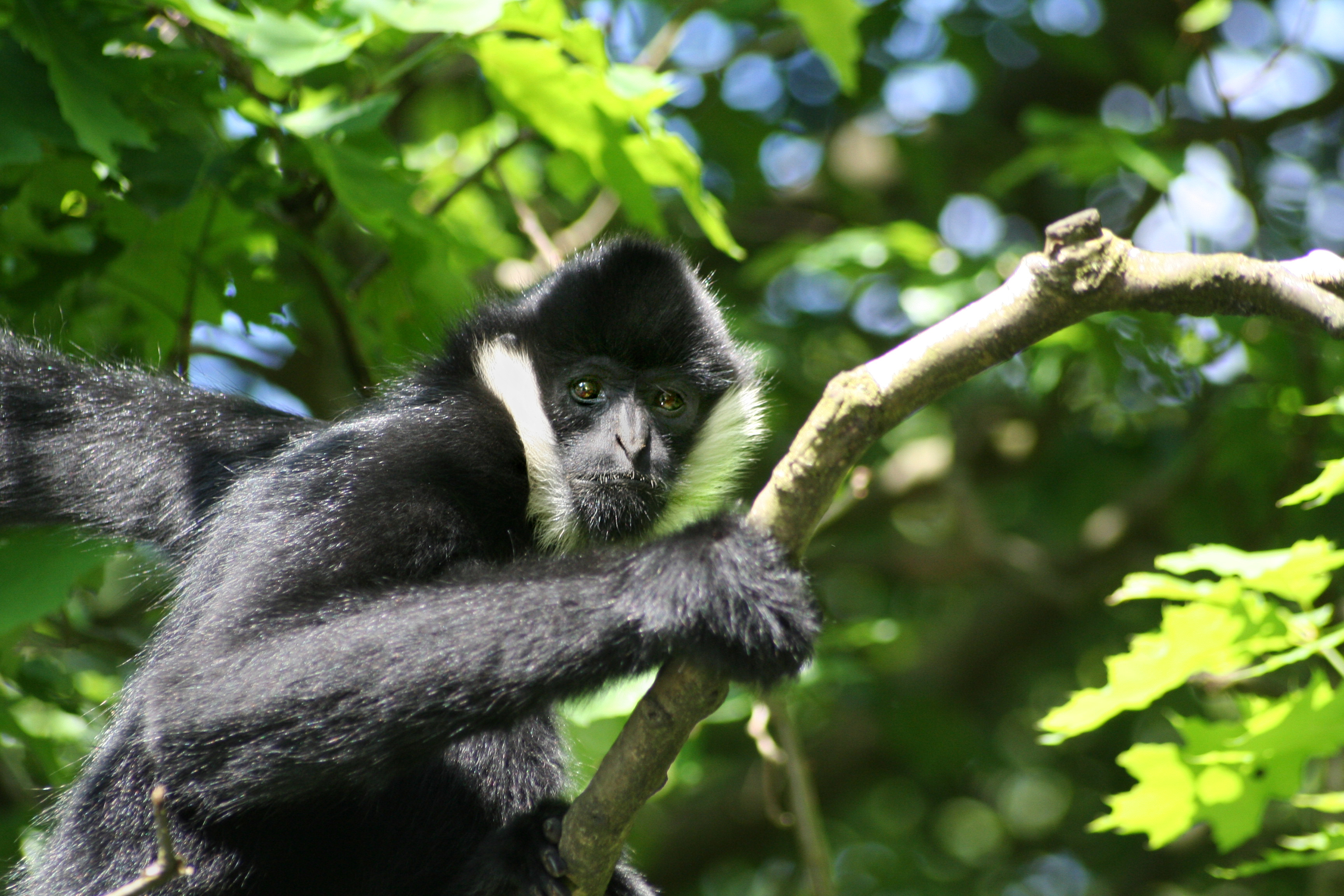
A male

== Predation ==
Adult gibbons typically live in the crown region of the forest where they have no natural predators except humans. Potential predators of yellow-cheeked gibbons in the lower stories of the forest include leopards, clouded leopards, and pythons.
