= Brachiation =

Swinging from trees using arms

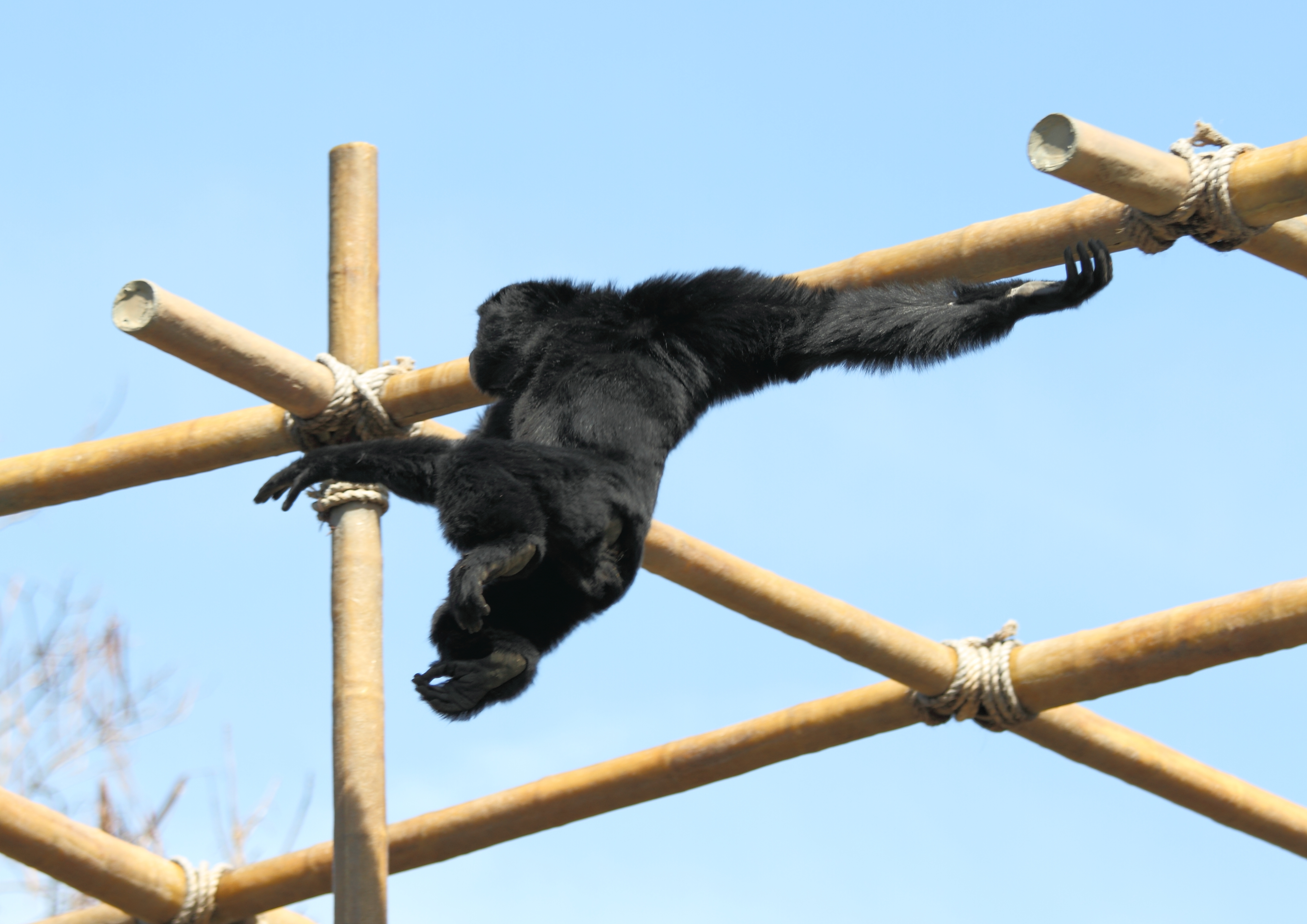
Brachiating primates such as this siamang (Symphalangus syndactylus) have long forelimbs and curved fingers

Brachiation (from "brachium", Latin for "arm"), or arm swinging, is a form of arboreal locomotion in which primates swing from tree limb to tree limb using only their arms. During brachiation, the body is alternately supported under each forelimb. This form of locomotion is the primary means of locomotion for the small gibbons and siamangs of southeast Asia. Gibbons in particular use brachiation for as much as 80% of their locomotor activities. Some New World monkeys, such as spider monkeys and muriquis, were initially classified as semibrachiators and move through the trees with a combination of leaping and brachiation. Some New World species also practice suspensory behaviors by using their prehensile tail, which acts as a fifth grasping hand. Evidence has shown that the extinct ape Proconsul from the Miocene of East Africa developed an early form of suspensory behaviour, and was therefore referred to as a probrachiator.

Upon further observations and more in depth understandings of the anatomy and behaviour of primates, the terms semibrachiator and probrachiator have largely fallen out of favour within the scientific community. Currently, researchers classify gibbons and siamangs as the only true brachiators and classify the great apes as modified brachiators. All other brachiation behaviours that do not meet either of these classifications are referred to as forearm suspensory postures and locomotion.

Some traits that allow primates to brachiate include a short spine (particularly the lumbar spine), short fingernails (instead of claws), long curved fingers, reduced thumbs, long forelimbs and freely rotating wrists. Modern humans retain many physical characteristics that suggest a brachiator ancestor, including flexible shoulder joints and fingers well-suited for grasping. In lesser apes, these characteristics were adaptations for brachiation. Although great apes do not normally brachiate (with the exception of orangutans), human anatomy suggests that brachiation may be an exaptation to bipedalism, and healthy modern humans are still capable of brachiating. Some children's parks include monkey bars which children play on by brachiating.

As well as shaping the evolution of gibbon body structure, brachiation has influenced the style and order of their behaviour. For example, unlike other primates who carry infants on their backs, gibbons will carry young ventrally. It also affects their play activities, copulation, and fighting. It is thought that gibbons gain evolutionary advantages through brachiation and being suspended by both hands (bimanual suspension) when feeding. While smaller primates cannot hold themselves by both hands for long periods, and larger primates are too heavy to exploit food resources on the ends of branches, gibbons can remain suspended for a significant period and use their long arms to reach food in terminal branches more easily. Another theory postulates that brachiation is a quieter and less obvious mode of locomotion than quadrupedal jumping and climbing, thereby more successfully avoiding predators.

== Types of brachiation ==
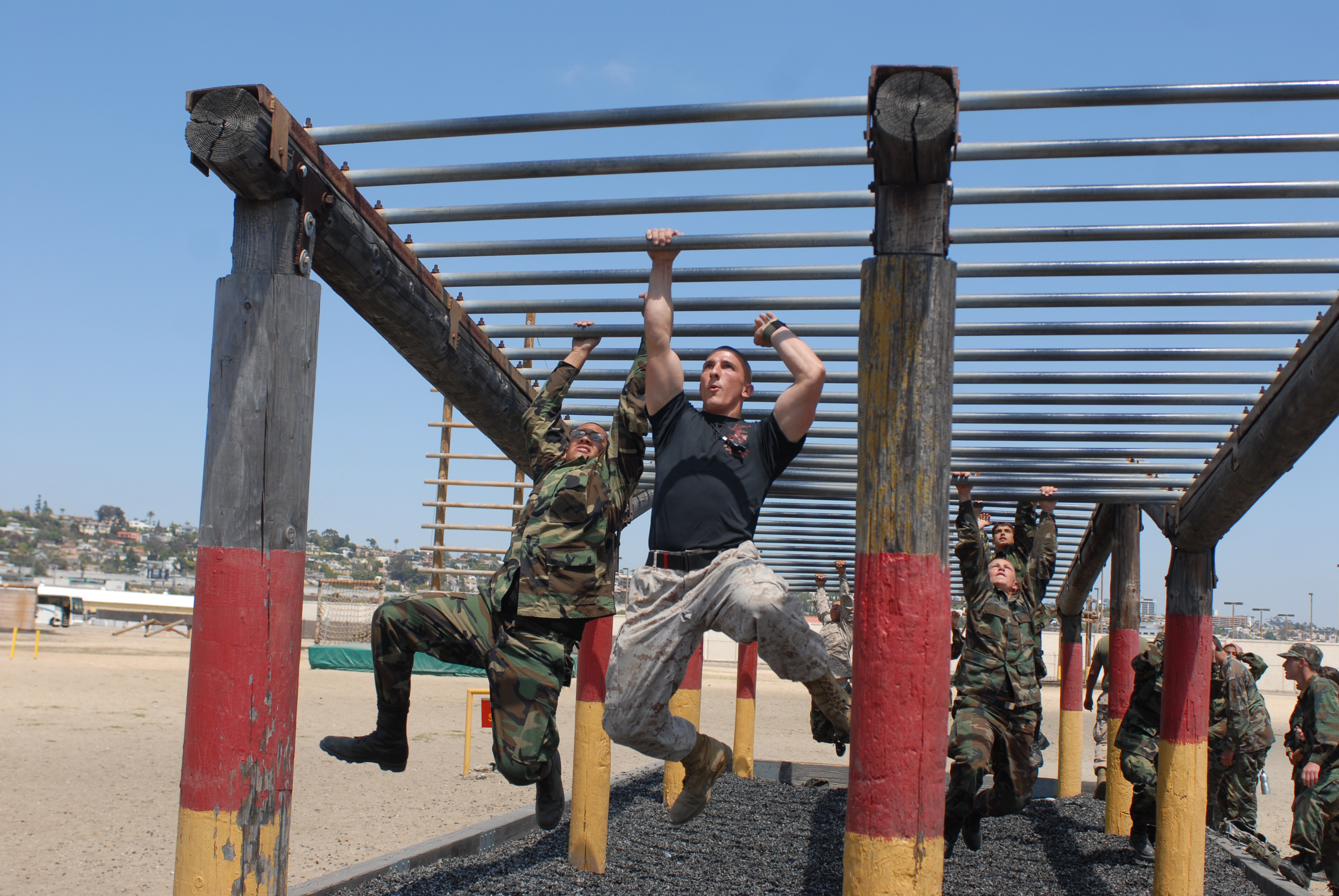
Although humans primarily move through bipedal locomotion, they retain several adaptations that allow them to use brachiation, as demonstrated here with a group of U.S. Marines using monkey bars.

=== Continuous contact ===
This form of brachiation occurs when the primate is moving at slower speeds and is characterized by the animal maintaining constant contact with a handhold, such as a tree branch. This gait type utilizes the passive exchange between two types of energy, gravitational potential and translational kinetic, to propel the animal forward at a low mechanical cost. This mode of brachiation has been compared to the movement patterns of bipedal walking in humans.

=== Ricochetal ===
This type of brachiation is used by primates to move at faster speeds and is characterized by a flight phase between each contact with a handhold. Ricochetal brachiation uses an exchange of translational and rotational kinetic energy to move forward, and is compared to a "whip-like" motion. Due to its aerial phase, ricochetal brachiation is similar to bipedal running in humans.

== Models of brachiation ==
=== Pendulum movement ===
Continuous contact brachiation has often been compared to the movement of a simple pendulum. This is due to the out-of-phase fluctuation of energy that occurs while the moving primate is swinging between each tree appendage as the energy transfers from potential to kinetic, and vice versa. The use of gravitational acceleration to effect movement can be found in both the brachiating primate and the moving ball in a pendulum model. A brachiator can make use of this momentum in several different ways: during the downswing the primate can maximize its change in kinetic energy, during the upswing it can minimize loss of kinetic energy or it can avoid moving laterally during its upward swing. Brachiating primates have adapted these three strategies for maximizing forward movement by adjusting its posture during each swing.

The amount of energy transferred from potential to kinetic during pendulum-like movement is known as energy recovery. Maintaining a higher energy recovery during brachiation costs less energy and allows the animal to move to its destination quickly; however, this type of movement is also harder to control. Therefore, since the risk of missing a handhold can result in injury or death, the benefit of moving slower with a lower energy recovery and more control likely outweighs the cost of extra energy expenditure.

== Evolution of brachiation ==
Brachiation originated in Africa, thirteen million years ago. The emergence of bigger primates that learn to move hanging around by branches obliges the new generations to make some corporal changes that have lasted until today, in many species, including the humans.

Specialized locomotor behaviours, such as brachiating, are thought to have evolved from arboreal quadrupedalism. This behaviour is the ancestral and most common locomotor mechanism among primates. This would explain why living apes and humans share many unusual morphological aspects of the upper limb and thorax. The transition to brachiation is regarded as a major shift during primate evolution and is thought to be a possible precursor to the adaptation of bipedal walking in early hominids. Specialized suspensory behaviour was shown to have evolved independently between hominid groups.

There are several hypotheses for how early brachiating primates may have transitioned into bipedalism. The most generally accepted of these is the vertical climbing hypothesis, which states that vertical climbing is the biomechanical link between brachiation and bipedalism. Many climbing adaptations have been found in early hominins and some of these adaptations can still be seen in present-day humans. The distinctive body posture, limb proportions and trunk design identified in living apes are better explained by the previous adaptation of climbing behaviours.

== See also ==
- Arboreal locomotion
- Suspensory behavior
