= Cronin =

Cronin is derived from the Irish surname Ó Cróinín which originated in County Cork, and the Old Irish word crón, meaning saffron-colored. The Cronin family have been prominent in politics and the arts in Ireland, the United States, Australia and the United Kingdom since the nineteenth century.

Notable people with the surname include:

- Alison Cronin, director of Monkey World
- A. J. Cronin (1896–1981), Scottish novelist
- A. L. Cronin (1902–1974), American lawyer and politician
- Anthony Cronin (1928–2016), Irish poet
- Barth S. Cronin (1858–1933), American politician from New York
- Bernard Cronin (1884–1968), Australian author and journalist
- Breeda Moynihan-Cronin (born 1953), Irish politician
- Brendan Cronin (disambiguation), several people
- Cornelius Cronin (1838–1912), Medal of Honor recipient during the American Civil War
- Dan Cronin (born 1959), American politician from Illinois
- Daniel Anthony Cronin (born 1927), Archbishop of Hartford
- David Edward Cronin (1839–1925), American painter
- Declan Cronin (born 1997), American baseball player
- Deverick John Cronin (1911–1979), Australian football player and commentator
- Glenn Cronin (born 1981), Irish football player
- Gráinne Cronin (born 1953), Irish airline pilot
- Greg Cronin (born 1963), American ice hockey coach
- Helena Cronin, English philosopher
- Henry Cronin (1894–1977), British civil engineer and army officer
- J. Wilmer Cronin (1896–1982), American politician and lawyer
- Jack Cronin (American football) (1903–1993), American football player
- James Cronin (1931–2016), American nuclear physicist
- Jeremy Cronin (born 1949), South African politician
- Jerry Cronin (1925–1990), Irish politician
- Jim Cronin (disambiguation), several people
- Joe Cronin (1906–1984), American baseball player
- John Cronin (disambiguation), several people
- John Francis Cronin (1908–1994), American priest
- Justin Cronin, American author
- Justin Cronin (politician) (1980–2020), American politician
- Katie Cronin (born 1977), American basketball player
- Keith Cronin (born 1986), Irish rally driver
- Kevin Cronin (born 1951), lead singer of REO Speedwagon
- Lance Cronin (born 1985), English football player
- Lee Cronin (disambiguation), several people
- Leroy Cronin (born 1973), British chemist
- Marcus Daniel Cronin (1865–1936), American military officer
- Marianne Cronin (born 1990), English-Irish novelist
- Michael Cronin (actor) (born 1942), English actor and writer
- Michael Cronin (academic) (born 1960), Irish academic and author
- Mick Cronin (basketball) (born 1971), American basketball coach
- Mikal Cronin (born 1985), American singer-songwriter
- Patrick Henry Cronin (1846–1889), American physician, murder victim
- Paul Cronin (1938–2019), Australian actor and owner of the Brisbane Bears
- Paul Cronin (judge), Australian judge
- Paul D. Cronin, American horseman, riding instructor and author
- Paul W. Cronin (1938–1997), American politician from Massachusetts
- Peter Cronin (born 1947), Australian Test cricket umpire
- R. F. Patrick Cronin (1926–2007), academic and healthcare consultant
- Rich Cronin (1975–2010), American singer and songwriter
- Sam Cronin (born 1986), American soccer player
- Seán Cronin, Chief of Staff of the IRA
- Seán Cronin (rugby union), Irish rugby player
- Shawn Cronin (born 1963), American ice hockey player
- Steve Cronin (born 1983), American soccer player
- Thomas Cronin (disambiguation), multiple people
- Vincent Cronin (1924–2011), British historical writer

== See also ==
- Cronan (surname)
