= Cronin (disambiguation) =

Cronin is a surname.

Cronin may also refer to:

- Cronin, Texas, unincorporated community in Anderson County

== See also ==
- Kronin, village in Elbląg County, Warmian-Masurian Voivodeship, Poland
- Cronan (disambiguation)
