= Cronan =

Cronan may refer to:

== People ==
- Cronan (surname)
- Saint Mo Chua of Balla, also known as Crónán (mac Bécáin)
- Saint Crónán of Roscrea
- Saint Cronan of Tuamgraney
- Saint Cronan Balnae
- John Cronan Kieffer, American mathematician
- Strom Cronan Thacker, American political scientist and academic administrator

== Places ==
- St. Cronan's Church (disambiguation)
- St Cronan's Park, a GAA stadium in Roscrea, Ireland
- Saint Cronan's Boys' National School, Bray, Ireland
- Temple Cronan, County Clare, Ireland

== See also ==
- Kronan (disambiguation)
