= Safari World =

Tourist attraction in Bangkok

Safari World ซาฟารีเวิลด์
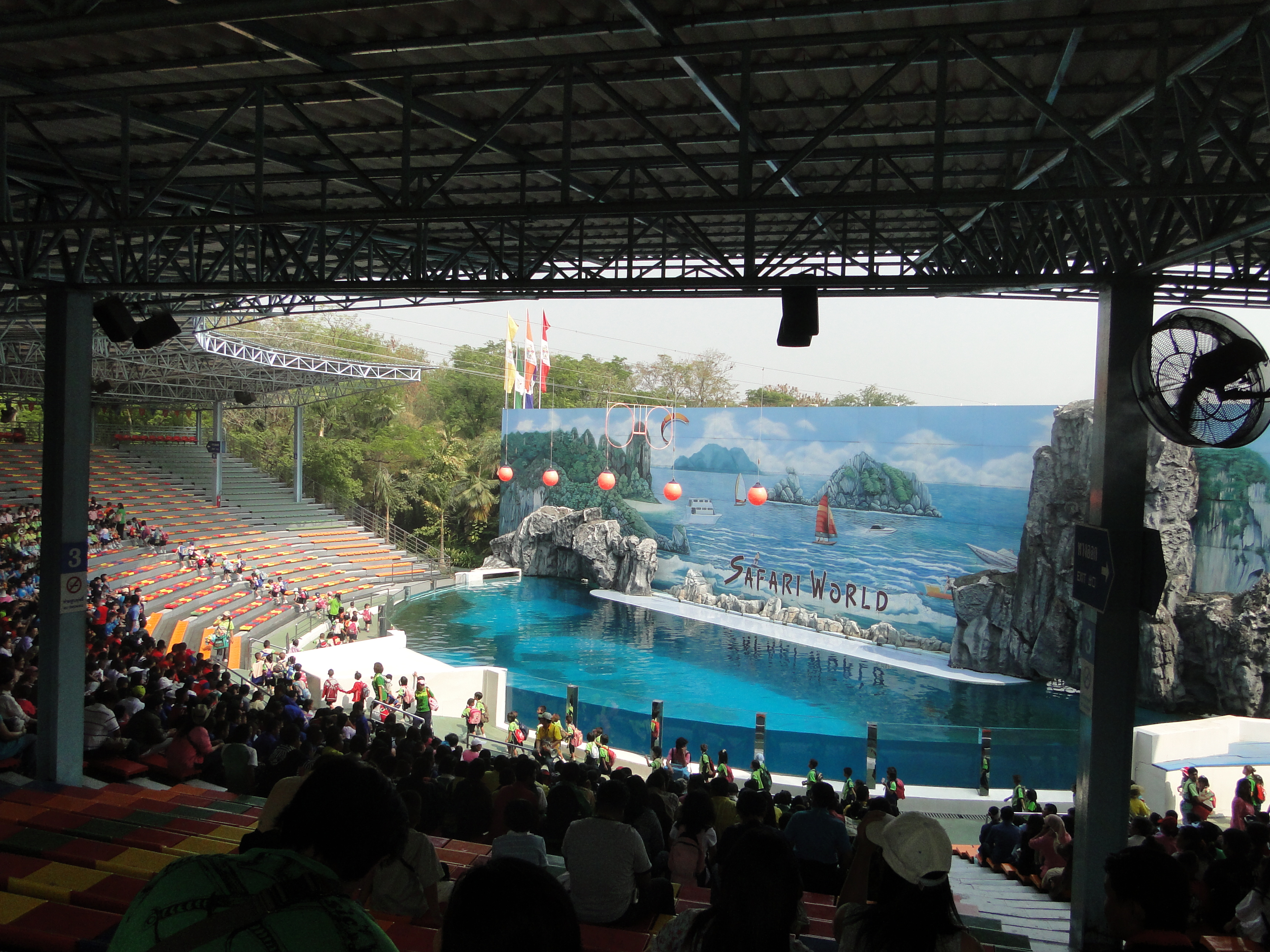
- The Dolphinarium show at Safari World
- Interactive map of Safari World ซาฟารีเวิลด์
- 13.865°N 100.703°E
- Date opened: February 17, 1988; 38 years ago
- Location: Khlong Sam Wa, Bangkok, Thailand
- Land area: 480 acres (190 ha)
- Owner: SET: SAFARI
- Website: www.safariworld.com

Safari World is a tourist attraction in Bangkok, Thailand that consists of two parks named Marine Park and Safari Park, operated by Safari World Public Limited. The park was opened in 1988 with a total area of 480 acres (190 ha) for its open zoo and 180 acres (73 ha) for its bird park. A major renovation to enhance effectiveness of land use began on 17 April 1989 and its total area developed for the leisure park now consists of an open zoo and a marine park on 500 rai (approximately 200 acres) of land.

On 1 February 1994, Safari World changed its name to Safari World Public Company Limited. Later, it was accepted by the Stock Exchange of Thailand (SET) to become the first and only entertainment park to be listed on SET on 16 February 1995. The park was later delisted from the Stock Exchange of Thailand effective 24 May 2025, after it was unable to regain the qualifications required for trading resumption.

== Safari Park ==
Safari Park is the largest section of the park. It is a 50-minute drive-through through an eight-kilometer park replicating a Savannah habitat. The safari park houses large herds of Asian and African ungulates and a very large free flying waterbirds sanctuary. The main drive-through area houses large herds of herbivores, with up to 100 individuals of a single species. There is a large herd of Masai giraffes with more than 200 individuals. Other animals include a herd of Grant's zebras, Black wildebeest, impalas, white rhinoceroses, Ankole cattle, African buffaloes, gemsbok, hippopotamuses and ostriches. A large number of Asian ungulates are also mixed with African hoofed mammals, such as gaur, nilgai, blackbuck, Sambar deer, Indian hog deer, fallow deer, spotted deer and Dromedary camels. The large waterbirds sanctuary surrounding the park houses a flock of great white pelicans, painted storks, Marabou storks, grey crowned cranes and other bird species. The carnivores have separate drive-throughs separated using gates. They include African lions, Bengal tigers, Asiatic black bears and American black bears, .

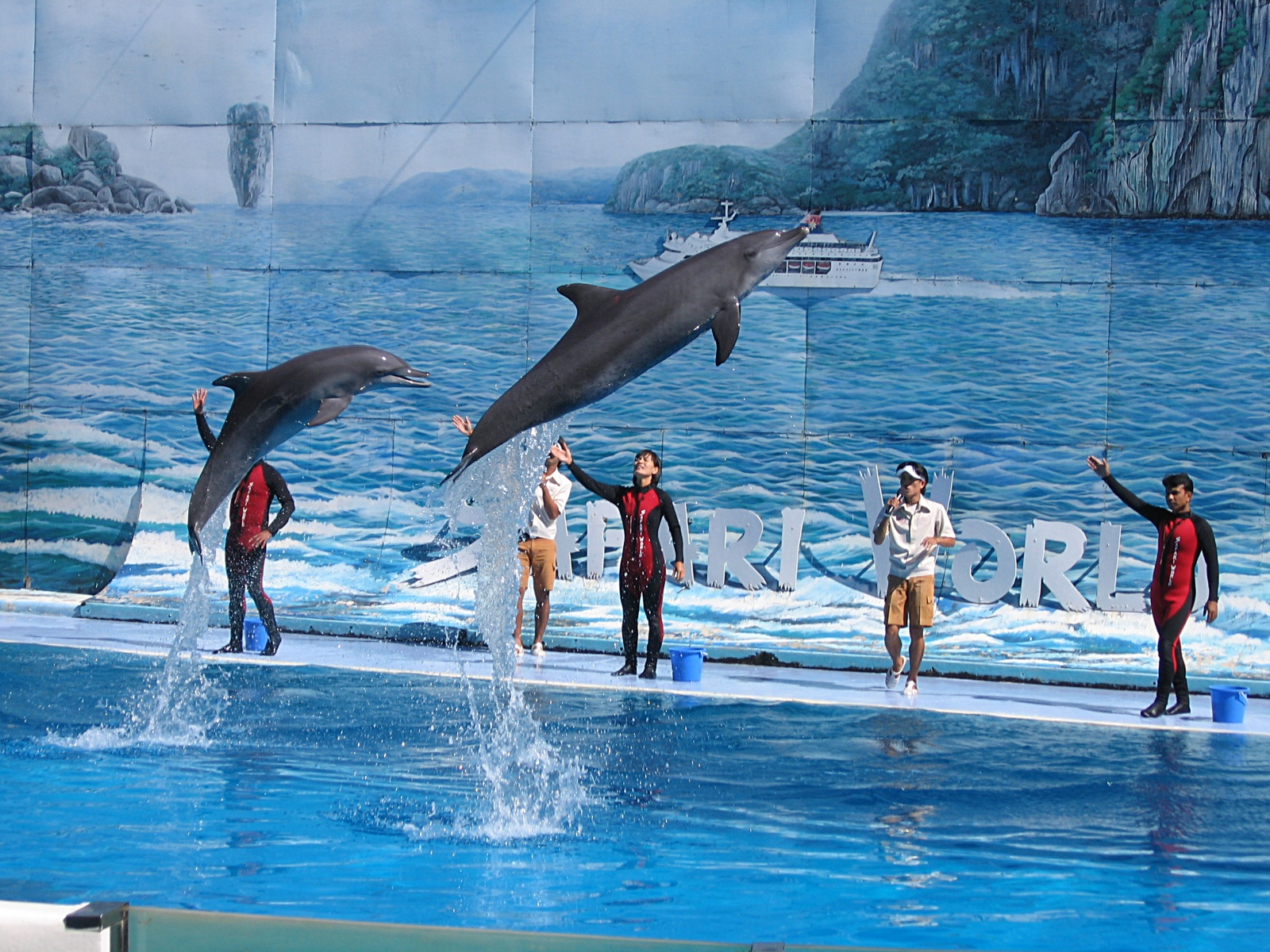
Dolphin show at Safari World

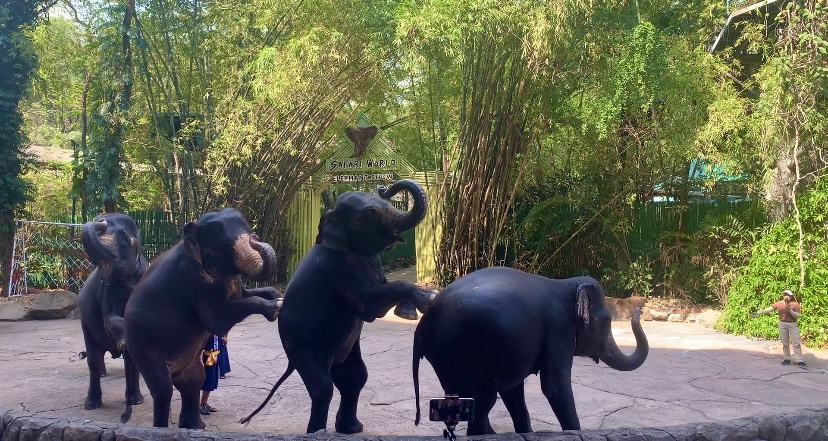
Elephant Show at Safari World

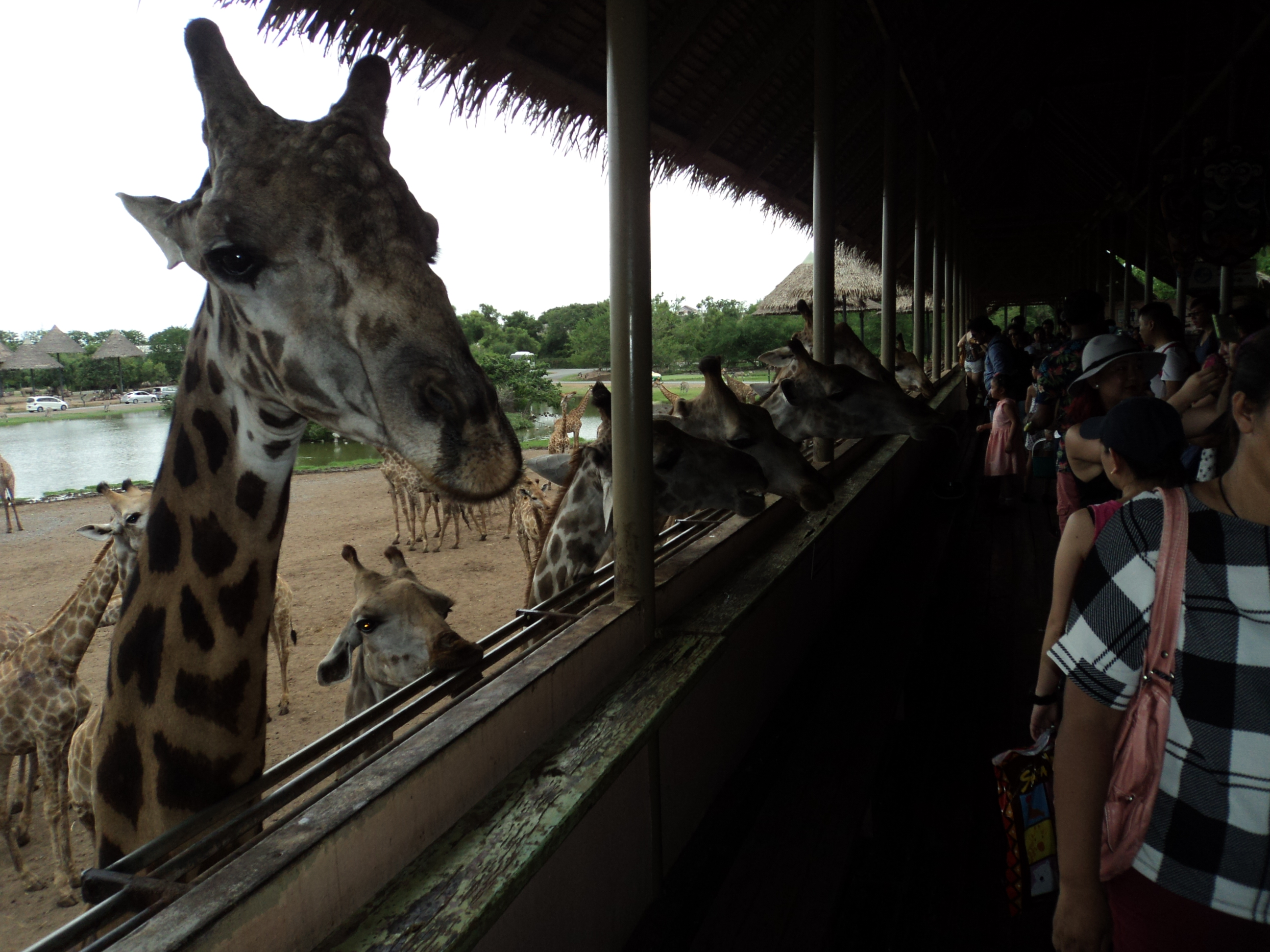
Feeding the giraffes

== Marine Park ==
Marine Park is the main park where various animal displays from all over the world are showcased. The main attractions of Safari World are located in Marine Park. Seven shows take place daily at different times, Dolphin show, Spy War show - including Cylon, Orangutan boxing show, Bird Show, Cowboy stunt show, Elephant show and Sea lion show. Other attractions at the Marine Park includes the Jungle cruise and Safari terrace, where visitors could feed hundreds of giraffes with bananas and leaves. The Marine Park has a walk-through aviary called Mini world where visitors could feed hundreds of free-flying sun conures on their hands. Mini World also has an aviary for Caribbean flamingoes, Wood duck and mandarin duck. Mini world aviary is the star attraction at Marine Park. Another aviary called Hornbill jungle with Great Indian hornbill, Wreathed hornbill, Oriental pied hornbill, Rhinoceros hornbill, Nicobar pigeon, Pied imperial pigeon and White-crowned hornbill is also there. There is another Macaw aviary with huge flocks of scarlet macaw, hyacinth macaw, Red-and-green macaw and Blue-and-yellow macaw. There are enclosures for marsupials like Red kangaroos, Agile wallaby and Bennett's wallaby, as well as for Australian birds like Emu and Southern cassowary.

Another exhibit, Tiger kingdom has enclosures for Bengal tigers, white tigers and Siberian tigers. Near the giraffe terrace are exhibits for ring-tailed lemurs, black-and-white ruffed lemurs and manatees. Besides mammals, there are over 100 aviaries housing small birds throughout the park.

Beside the sea lion show theatre is an exhibit for Malayan tapirs. Other animals in the park's collection include capybaras, African porcupines, leopards, walruses, green iguanas, African spurred tortoises, Burmese pythons, nyalas, Dromedary camels, mandrills, pygmy hippopotamuses, freshwater stingrays, Red-shanked douc langurs, black-and-white colobus monkeys, binturongs, meerkats, toco toucans and raccoons. A very large exhibit housing a very large group of siamese crocodiles is also there with separate exhibits for false gharials and a giant saltwater crocodile. Large aquariums for exotic freshwater fish, such as arapaima and Mekong giant catfish are spread throughout the park. A large lake in which visitors can rent paddle-boats is filled with mute swans and black swans.

== Controversy ==
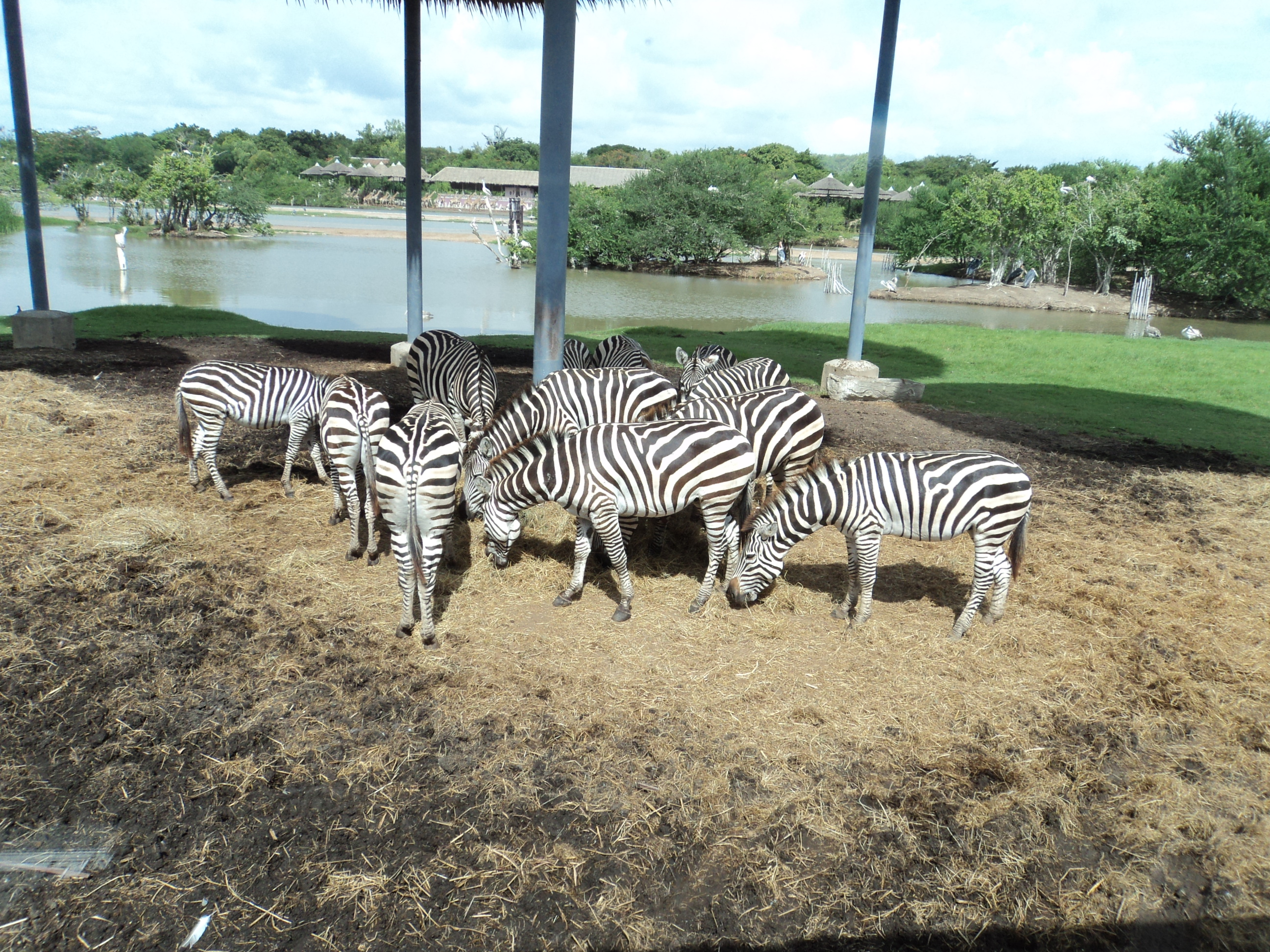
Zebras in Safari World

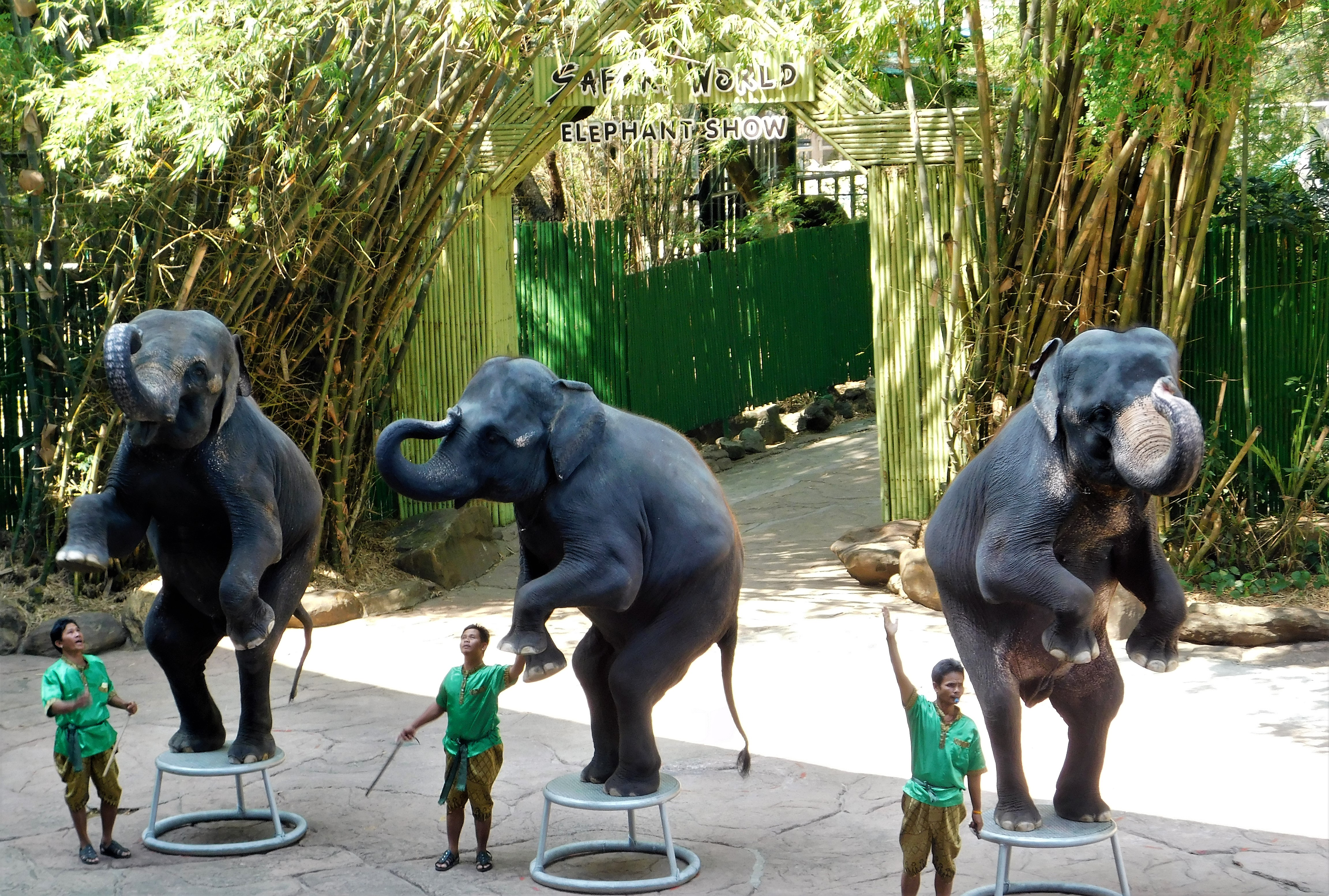
Elephant Show in Safari World

There has been controversy about Safari World for its treatment of animals. Their operation came under international scrutiny when their treatment of animals, particularly orangutans and elephants, and keeping lion and tiger cubs in cramped cages was focused on. The treatment of orangutans came to the attention of Jim and Alison Cronin, the founders of Monkey World, a primate sanctuary based in Dorset in the United Kingdom, and animal rights campaigners and other animal rights groups such as PETA, as well as being featured in a 2013 episode of the British animal rescue show Wildlife SOS.

The zoo's operating permit expired in October 2024. In September 2025, one of Safari World's zookeepers died after being mauled by a pack of lions, prompting the closure of its big cat enclosures.

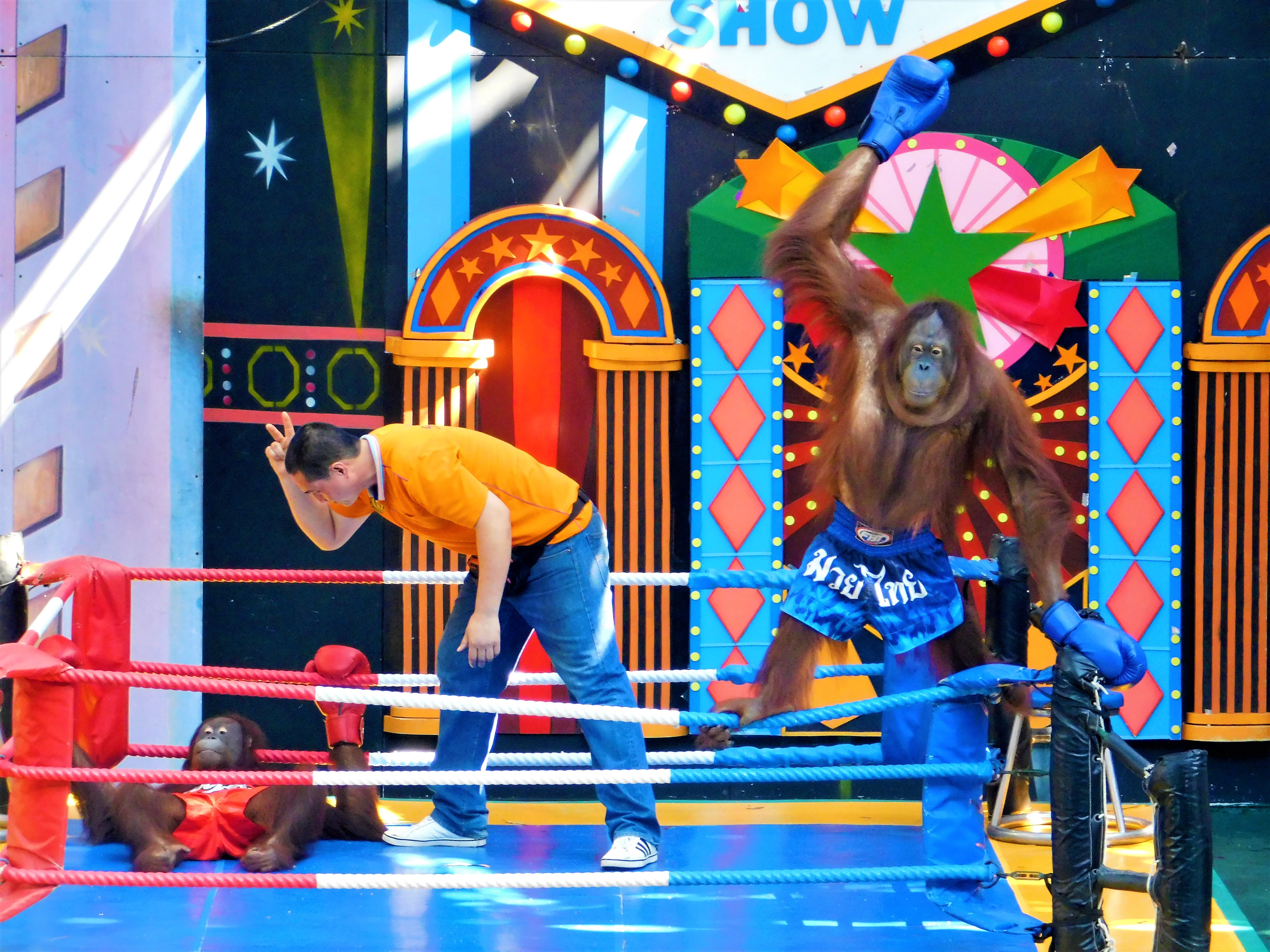
Orangutan Show in Safari World

== See also ==
- Dream World (Thai amusement park)
- Siam Park City
