= Down by the Water (PJ Harvey song) =

1995 single by PJ Harvey

Single by PJ Harvey

from the album To Bring You My Love
- B-side: "Lying in the Sun"; "Somebody's Down, Somebody's Name"
- Released: 2 February 1995
- Studio: Townhouse (London)
- Genre: Art rock; alternative rock
- Length: 3:15
- Label: Island
- Songwriter: PJ Harvey
- Producers: Flood; John Parish; PJ Harvey

PJ Harvey singles chronology
"Man-Size" (1993)	"Down by the Water" (1995)	"C'mon Billy" (1995)

Music video
- "Down by the Water" on YouTube

"Down by the Water" is a song by the English alternative rock musician PJ Harvey. It is the seventh track and the lead single from her third studio album, To Bring You My Love, released in February 1995 on Island Records. The song was written by Harvey, and self-produced with Flood and John Parish.

The song diverged significantly from Harvey's former indie rock and punk blues influence, opting to use electronic instruments such as a synthesized organ and an orchestral ensemble. The lyrics narrate the story of a woman drowning her daughter and reference the traditional American folk song "Salty Dog Blues".

"Down by the Water" received critical acclaim upon its release, charting in Canada, Ireland, the United Kingdom, and the United States. The song was Harvey's mainstream breakthrough in the US, where the song reached number 2 on Billboard's Modern Rock Tracks chart, making it her highest-charting single in the US, and received extensive rotation on MTV and college radio stations.

== Composition ==
"Down by the Water" was written by Harvey, who also produced along with Flood and John Parish. The song opens with vocals and a heavy organ played by Harvey. As the song progresses it incorporates several more elements, including percussion instruments, drums, and an orchestral ensemble. Pete Thomas conducted the string parts for the song. The musicians in the ensemble include Sonia Slany on violin, Jocelyn Pook and Jules Singleton on viola, and Sian Bell on cello. The song derives elements from blues and electronica, the latter due to the notable use of a synthesized organ. The song is also flecked with percussions which are claves.

The song's lyrics tell the story of a woman committing filicide. The woman drowns her daughter "down by the water" and "won't see her again". The final coda features Harvey whispering the lines: "little fish, big fish swimming in the water / come back here, man, gimme my daughter". The refrain was based on Lead Belly's rendition of the traditional American folk song "Salty Dog Blues". In 2005, Harvey used the song's lyrics in a Spin interview as an example to demonstrate that her songs were not autobiographical: "Some critics have taken my writing so literally to the point that they'll listen to 'Down by the Water' and believe I have actually given birth to a child and drowned her."

== Release and critical reception ==
"Down by the Water" was released in the United Kingdom and Australia on Island Records in February 1995. It was the lead single from the album To Bring You My Love, and was pressed on CD and 7" vinyl. The CD single and the 7" featured two B-sided, "Lying in the Sun" and "Somebody's Down, Somebody's Name". The song charted in four countries upon its release; peaking at number 78 in Canada, number 28 in Ireland, and number 38 in the United Kingdom. The song charted in two charts in the United States; peaking at number 48 on Billboard' Hot 100 Airplay, and reaching number 2 on the Billboard Modern Rock Tracks (it was extremely popular on college radios). "Down by the Water" was also on heavy rotation on MTV.

Critical reception to "Down by the Water" was positive. AllMusic editor Stephen Thomas Erlewine retrospectively noted the song was an AllMusic pick and called Harvey's songwriting "tighter and more melodic than before", adding that "the menacing 'Down by the Water' has genuine hooks." Robert Hilburn of the Los Angeles Times noted the song in 1995 as one of To Bring You My Love's "most gripping moments", adding "she speaks with the captivating clarity and force of someone reaching for a final, life-saving anchor". "Down by the Water" was later nominated for a Grammy Award for Best Female Rock Vocal Performance at the 38th Grammy Awards.

In 2005, Diplo sampled "Down by the Water" for a remix of the Mike Jones single "Still Tippin", and then again the following year on Plastic Little's indie rap track "Now I Hollar".

== Music video ==
Maria Mochnacz directed the music video for "Down by the Water". Owing to the large promotional push by Island Records for To Bring You My Love, the video received a higher budget than Harvey's two previous music videos for the company. It was recorded with a large crew over the course of two days in London, in contrast with the "anti-pop" video for "Man-Size", and was shot on 35mm film. Two camera assistants, Seamus McGarvey, and Mike Valentine, separately recorded the different scenes of the video; McGarvey recorded the dancing scenes and Valentine recorded the underwater scenes. A body double replaced Harvey for some of the underwater footage.

The video features Harvey dancing in a red satin dress with a large wig and excessive make-up. She dubbed her appearance "Joan Crawford on acid" in an interview with Spin in 1996. Describing the video in an interview with JBTV, she said: "it was a hard video to make actually that one. It was two days worth of jumping in and out of a swimming pool. Well, one day was just in the swimming pool and the other day was just dancing on a rotating platform but it was quite hard-going after all", adding "it was quite scary as well because I was jumping in with a wig which was really, really heavy so it was quite difficult to get to the surface again. And wearing high-heel silver shoes, not the best thing for swimming in."

The video was nominated for Best Female Video at the 1995 MTV Video Music Awards.

== Track listings ==
UK CD single (IS CID 607)

1. "Down by the Water" – 3:15
2. "Somebody's Down, Somebody's Name" – 3:42

UK 7-inch single (IS 607)

1. "Down by the Water" – 3:15
2. "Lying in the Sun" – 4:32
3. "Somebody's Down, Somebody's Name" – 3:42

== Personnel ==
Personnel are adapted from the To Bring You My Love liner notes.

Musicians

- PJ Harvey – vocals, organ, producer, engineer
- Joe Gore – guitar
- John Parish – drums, percussion

Guest musicians

- Pete Thomas – string arrangements
- Sonia Slany – violin
- Jocelyn Pook – viola
- Jules Singleton – viola
- Sian Bell – cello

Technical personnel

- Flood – producer, engineer, mixing

== Charts ==
Chart (1995)	Peak position
Australian Singles Chart	84
Canadian RPM Top 100	78
Europe (Eurochart Hot 100)	76
Irish Singles Chart	28
UK Singles Chart	38
US Billboard Hot 100 Airplay	48
US Billboard Modern Rock Tracks	2

== Release history ==
Region	Date	Format(s)	Label(s)	Ref.
United States	2 February 1995	Modern rock radio	Island	
United Kingdom	6 February 1995	7-inch vinyl; CD	Island	
Australia	20 February 1995	CD	Island	
Australia	3 March 1995	Cassette	Island	
