= Saint Cronan =

Saint Cronan may refer to a number of Irish saints:

- Mo Chua of Balla, also known as Crónán mac Bécáin, a 7th-century Roman Catholic saint from western Ireland
- Saint Cronan Beg (Cronan the little), a 7th-century bishop of Aendrum in County Down
- Crónán of Roscrea, a 7th-century Roman Catholic saint known for his work in Roscrea, County Tipperary
- Saint Cronan Balnae (Cronan of Balla), a 7th-century successor to Mo Chua of Balla
- Saint Cronan of Tuamgraney, a 6th-century abbot associated with County Clare
- Saint Crónán Mochua of Clondalkin, a 6th/7th-century monk associated with Clondalkin
