= Mr. Lucky =

Mr. Lucky may refer to:

- Mr. Lucky (film), a 1943 film starring Cary Grant
- Mr. Lucky (TV series), a 1959–1960 adventure/drama series by Blake Edwards
  - "Mr. Lucky", theme to the 1959–1960 TV series, written by Henry Mancini
- Mr. Lucky (Chris Isaak album)
- Mr. Lucky (John Lee Hooker album)
- Mr. Lucky (Pete Thomas album)
- Mr. Lucky (Harold Mabern album)
- Mr. Lucky's, a honky-tonk in Scottsdale, Arizona that operated from 1966–2004

== See also ==
- Mr. Lucky and the Gamblers, a 1960s American garage rock band
- Lucky Man (disambiguation)
