= John Cronin =

John Cronin may refer to:

- John Cronin (horticulturist) (1865–1923), director of the Royal Botanic Gardens, Melbourne
- John Cronin (New Zealand politician), currently the chairperson of the Bay of Plenty's regional council
- John Cronin (British politician) (1916–1986), British surgeon and Labour Party politician
- John Cronin (convict) (born 1971), repeat-offence Scottish convict who become the first convict to be tracked by satellite in the UK
- John Francis Cronin (1908–1994), priest, author of Communism: a World Menace
- John Cronin (Massachusetts politician), US politician
- John Cronin (ice hockey) (born 1980), former US hockey player
- John Cronin (Gaelic footballer) (1923–1992), Irish Gaelic footballer
- John Cronin (boccia), Paralympic boccia player
