= Kronan =

Kronan may refer to:

- Kronan (ship), a 17th-century Swedish warship sunk in the Baltic Sea
- Krónan, an Icelandic supermarket chain
- Kronan (bicycle), a Swedish bicycle brand
- Kronan, a brand of snus produced by Swedish Match
- Kronan (comics), an alien race in the Marvel Comics
- Kronan, a fantasy hero of Spanish comic artist Jaime Brocal Remohí

== See also ==
- Crown (headgear)
- Kronen, German brewery
- Kronin, village in Poland
- Cronan (disambiguation)
