= To Bring You My Love =

Studio album by PJ Harvey
- Released: 27 February 1995
- Recorded: September–October 1994
- Studio: Townhouse (London)
- Genres: Alternative rock; punk blues; blues rock
- Length: 42:27
- Label: Island
- Producers: Flood; John Parish; PJ Harvey

PJ Harvey chronology
4-Track Demos (1993)	To Bring You My Love (1995)	Is This Desire? (1998)

John Parish & Polly Jean Harvey chronology
Dance Hall at Louse Point (1996)

Singles from To Bring You My Love
- 1. "Down by the Water" Released: February 2, 1995; 2. "C'mon Billy" Released: July 1995; 3. "Send His Love to Me" Released: October 1995

To Bring You My Love is the third studio album by the English alternative rock musician PJ Harvey, released on 27 February 1995 by Island Records. Recorded after the break-up of the PJ Harvey trio, it stands as her first proper solo album. The songs on the album are heavily influenced by American blues music.

Harvey co-produced the record with Flood and John Parish. To Bring You My Love would be the first of Harvey's many collaborations with Flood and Parish. The music on the album was played largely by Harvey and Parish, with contributions from seasoned musicians Joe Gore, Mick Harvey, Jean-Marc Butty, and others. Many of the musicians who appeared on the album joined Harvey on tour to support it in 1995.

To Bring You My Love is considered to be PJ Harvey's breakthrough. It garnered massive critical acclaim worldwide and became her best-selling studio album. The single "Down by the Water" received extensive airplay on radio and on MTV. The album was placed on Rolling Stone magazine's original list of the 500 greatest albums of all time.

== Background and history ==
PJ Harvey took a break from the spotlight in 1994. After releasing two studio albums (Dry and Rid of Me) and a compilation (4-Track Demos) in less than two years, she kept a low profile for most of the year. Harvey made only one public appearance in 1994, performing a cover version of the Rolling Stones' "(I Can't Get No) Satisfaction" with Icelandic singer Björk at the annual BRIT Awards.

Using the royalties that she had received from her first two studio albums, she bought a house in rural England close to her parents' home in Yeovil. She described her new home as "completely in the countryside. I have no neighbours. When I look out the window, all I see are fields." Living in near isolation, she began writing the songs that would appear on To Bring You My Love.

== Recording ==
To Bring You My Love was Harvey's first album of new material since disbanding the original PJ Harvey trio in 1993. For this recording she recruited producer Flood, her old Automatic Dlamini bandmate John Parish and a new line-up of session musicians including multi-instrumentalists Joe Gore, Eric Drew Feldman, Mick Harvey and drummer Jean-Marc Butty. She herself played guitar, keyboards, vibraphone and bells on the record, as well as co-producing it with Flood and John Parish.

== Music and lyrics ==
"To Bring You My Love"
The title track recalls the blues of Robert Johnson as well as the song "Dirt" by The Stooges.

"Meet ze Monsta"

"Down by the Water"
The song features extensive use of a synthesized organ and features an orchestral ensemble.

"The Dancer"
The album's closing track is influenced by the Spaghetti Western soundtracks of Ennio Morricone.

The subject matter and tone of the songs on To Bring You My Love differ somewhat from what Harvey had presented on her earlier albums. The songs on Rid of Me (1993), for example, are more aggressive in their depictions of relationships. They focus more on revenge ("Rid of Me", "Rub 'til It Bleeds"), or act as an attack on traditional masculinity ("Man-Size", "50ft Queenie", "Me-Jane"). Although these songs do directly consider longing and loss, many of the songs on To Bring You My Love focus particularly on these topics, specifically considering the loss of, or longing for, a departed lover. The title track presents a narrator who not only desires love but is willing to sacrifice everything to get it. "I've lain with the devil," Harvey sings, "Cursed God above/Forsaken Heaven/To bring you my love."

Many of the songs on To Bring You My Love employ biblical imagery such as Heaven, God, and Jesus Christ. Harvey, however, is not a religious person. She was not baptized and did not attend church as a child. She spoke of her use of religious imagery by saying "I look towards religion as possibly one means to finding an answer, to making sense why we're here. That's what drives the creative force, to make sense of one's life. A very natural place to look is in that divine area, because it's so strong and has been here long before us."

With the exception of two tracks ("Meet ze Monsta" and "Long Snake Moan") the album is considered much softer musically than her previous studio albums.

Many references are made to one of Harvey's major influences, Captain Beefheart. The opening line of the album, "I was born in the desert", is also the opening line of Beefheart's debut studio album, Safe as Milk (1967). The album's second track, "Meet ze Monsta", is a direct response (from the perspective of one of the "young girls" invited to meet the monster) to Beefheart's "Tropical Hot Dog Night", the second track of his 1978 album Shiny Beast (Bat Chain Puller), an album which Harvey has said had a particular impact on her. A lyrical and melodic resemblance to Beefheart's "Dropout Boogie" is also found on the track "I Think I'm a Mother," and the vocal melody at the end of Harvey's "Teclo" ("Let me ride on his grace for a while...") seems to mirror Beefheart's melody in "Her Eyes Are a Blue Million Miles".

Musically, the album is more complicated than Dry or Rid of Me. Two guitar parts are used in many of the songs, in most cases played by Harvey and Parish. Acoustic guitar and strings, used sparingly in her previous releases, can be heard throughout To Bring You My Love. Bells, chimes, and a vibraphone add to the atmosphere of the recording. Keyboards and organ are also used extensively, a result of much of the album being composed on a Yamaha keyboard Harvey bought second-hand. The deep, rumbling organ tones provide many of the lower notes on the album, replacing traditional basslines.

== Critical reception ==
Professional ratings
Review scores
Source	Rating
AllMusic	4.5/5 stars
Chicago Sun-Times	4/4 stars
Entertainment Weekly	A
The Guardian	4/4 stars
Los Angeles Times	4/4 stars
NME	8/10
Rolling Stone	4/5 stars
The Rolling Stone Album Guide	4.5/5 stars
Spin	10/10
The Village Voice	A

As her second full-length release on a major label, To Bring You My Love received a heavy promotional push from Island Records. Extensive MTV rotation and college radio airplay for the first single "Down by the Water" — with its eccentric, eye-catching Maria Mochnacz-directed music video of Harvey drowning in an emerald pond while wearing an extravagant wig, heavy make-up and a slinky red satin evening gown — gave Harvey her biggest radio hit to date, reaching number two on Billboard's Modern Rock chart. The album itself debuted at number 40 on the Billboard 200 and number 12 in the UK, and went on to sell roughly one million copies. The moderate commercial breakthrough of To Bring You My Love had nothing to do with any scaling-down of her trademark lyrical intensity: the infanticide fable "Down by the Water" — whose whispered coda of "Little fish big fish swimming in the water/Come back here, man, gimme my daughter" references the old Lead Belly blues standard "Salty Dog" — ostensibly deals with a mother drowning her child.

The critical response was overwhelmingly positive. Rolling Stone praised the record as "astonishing" in its four-star review. The Independent shared the same point of view, writing that Harvey's performance "make[s] the record stand out from its peers"; reviewer Nicholas Barber saw it as "a threatening, nightmarish creature", adding "imagine Siouxsie and the Bad Seeds". Los Angeles Times noted the "rich imagery" of the lyrics, writing that "in the most gripping moments, [...] [Harvey] speaks with the captivating clarity and force of someone reaching for a final, life-saving anchor."

== Accolades ==
The album received universal acclaim. It was voted as the best album of the year in The Village Voice's Pazz & Jop critics' poll by a wide margin, and was also voted the year's number-one album by publications such as Rolling Stone, The New York Times, People, USA Today, Hot Press and, in "the biggest landslide victory in 15 years", the Los Angeles Times. It featured in Top Ten lists for magazines like Spin, NME, Melody Maker, Mojo and The Wire, though a contrarian Time list dubbed it the "Worst Album of 1995." The album received two Grammy Award nominations as Best Alternative Music Performance and Best Female Rock Vocal Performance for the single "Down by the Water", and was nominated for the Mercury Music Prize. According to AskBillboard, To Bring You My Love sold 371,000 copies in the United States as of December 2005.

Retrospectively, Spin ranked To Bring You My Love at number three in a list of the best albums of the 1990s. In 2003, Rolling Stone ranked the album at number 435 on its list of the 500 greatest albums of all time. Slant Magazine, in 2011, ranked To Bring You My Love as the 20th best album of the 1990s. In 2024, Paste's list of the 300 greatest albums of all time ranked the album at number 42.

== Track listing ==
All tracks are written by PJ Harvey.

No.	Title	Length
1.	"To Bring You My Love"	5:32
2.	"Meet ze Monsta"	3:29
3.	"Working for the Man"	4:45
4.	"C'mon Billy"	2:47
5.	"Teclo"	4:57
6.	"Long Snake Moan"	5:17
7.	"Down by the Water"	3:14
8.	"I Think I'm a Mother"	4:00
9.	"Send His Love to Me"	4:20
10.	"The Dancer"	4:06
Total length:		42:27

Limited edition B-sides CD
No.	Title	Length
1.	"Reeling" (demo version)	3:00
2.	"Daddy"	3:16
3.	"Lying in the Sun"	4:30
4.	"Somebody's Down, Somebody's Name"	3:40
5.	"Darling Be There"	3:46
6.	"Maniac"	4:01
7.	"One Time Too Many"	2:52
8.	"Harder"	2:05
9.	"Goodnight (demo version)"	4:17
Total length:		31:27

== Personnel ==
Musicians

- PJ Harvey – vocals, organ, guitar (1, 4, 5, 8), piano (5, 6), vibraphone (1), marimba (9), bells (5), chimes (5), percussion (9)
- John Parish – guitar (1, 2, 6, 9, 10), organ (6), drums (4–8, 10), percussion (1–4, 6, 7, 9, 10)
- Joe Gore – guitar (2–4, 6, 7), e-bow (1)
- Mick Harvey – bass (6), organ (9)
- Jean-Marc Butty – drums (2), percussion (9)
- Joe Dilworth – drums (3)
- Pete Thomas – string arrangements
- Sonia Slany – violin (4, 7, 9)
- Jocelyn Pook – viola (4, 7, 9)
- Jules Singleton – viola (4, 7, 9)
- Sian Bell – cello (4, 7, 9)

Production

- Flood – producer, engineer, mixing
- PJ Harvey – producer, engineer (1, 4, 5, 7)
- John Parish – producer
- Howie Weinberg – mastering

Design

- Martin Callomon – artwork, art direction
- Valerie Phillips – photography
- Kate Garner – photography

== Charts ==
=== Weekly charts ===
1995 weekly chart performance for To Bring You My Love
Chart (1995)	Peak position
Australian ARIA Albums Chart	38
Belgian Albums Chart (Flanders)	5
Belgian Albums Chart (Wallonia)	31
Canadian Albums Chart	39
Dutch Top 100	69
European Albums (Eurotipsheet)	30
French Albums Chart	23
German Albums Chart	47
New Zealand RIANZ Top 40	24
Norwegian Albums Charts	11
Scottish Albums (Official Charts)	21
Swedish Albums Chart	11
Swiss Hitparade Chart	38
UK Albums Chart	12
US Billboard 200	40

2020 weekly chart performance for To Bring You My Love
Chart (2020)	Peak position
Austrian Albums (Ö3 Austria)	73
German Albums (Offizielle Top 100)	39
Norwegian Vinyl Albums (VG-lista)	2
Swiss Albums (Schweizer Hitparade)	27

=== Year-end charts ===
1995 year-end chart performance for To Bring You My Love
Chart (1995)	Position
Swedish Albums & Compilations Chart	97

=== Singles ===
Year	Single	Peak positions					
Year	Single	AU	CA	IE	UK	US Main	US Mod
1995	"Down by the Water"	84	78	28	38	48	2
1995	"C'mon Billy"	—	—	—	29	—	—
1995	"Send His Love to Me"	—	—	—	34	—	—
"—" denotes releases that did not chart.

== Certifications and sales ==
Certifications and sales for To Bring You My Love
Region	Certification	Certified units/sales
Belgium (BRMA)	Gold	25,000^{*}
United Kingdom (BPI)	Gold	100,000^{^}
United States	—	371,000
Summaries
Worldwide	—	1,000,000
^{*} Sales figures based on certification alone.^{^} Shipments figures based on certification alone.
