= Primatology and Conservation at Oxford Brookes University =

Primatalogy and conservation programmes

Primatology and Conservation
- Established: 1975
- Founder: Professor Simon Bearder
- Type: Research and teaching centre
- Course Tutor: Professor Giuseppe Donati
- Parent organization: Oxford Brookes University
- Website: www.brookes.ac.uk/social-sciences/courses/primate-conservation

The Primatology and Conservation programmes at Oxford Brookes University are part of the Department of Social Science, with links to the Department of Health and Life Sciences. It traces its origins to the anthropology courses offered at the then Oxford Polytechnic in the 1970s and developed into a globally recognised centre for primate conservation.

== History ==
Oxford Brookes University began as the Oxford School of Art in 1865; as early as 1975, primatology and primate evolution was taught as part of the anthropology programme which was also available to biology and psychology students. Research in these early days had a strong focus on ecology and behaviour in particular of nocturnal primates. In 2000, the MSc in Primate Conservation was established, allowing students from all over the world to focus on the conservation of primates. In 2008, Oxford Brookes University was the recipient of the Queen's Anniversary Prize for Higher and Further Education specifically for its postgraduate degrees and training for the conservation of primates in their global habitats.

== Areas of research ==
Taking a holistic view, research on primates and conservation at Oxford Brookes University centres on the primates themselves, the human that live side by side with primates, globalisation and its effect on primates, and newly emerging trends that have the potential to impede on the conservation of primates and their habitat. Research takes place both in area where primates occur naturally (Central and South America, Africa and Madagascar, Asia, Europe) as well as in captive settings.

The programme has strong links with (primate) conservation programmes in various parts of the world, including Neotropical Primate Conservation, Entropica, EcoVerde Global Consulting Monitor Conservation Research Society (Monitor), Moroccan Primate Conservation Foundation, Orangutan Information Centre and Project Anoulak.

== Teaching programmes ==
Primatology and conservation is taught as part of the BSc/BA in Anthropology and Biological Anthropology; BSc Animal Biology and Conservation; the postgraduate diploma in Anthropology; the MSc in Conservation Ecology; the MSc in Primate Conservation; the MRes in Primatology and Conservation.

Doctoral research takes place in the School of Law Social Sciences and the School of Biological and Medical Sciences.

The subject areas in which primatology and conservation are taught have been ranked as follows. QS rankings by subject (2025): Social Sciences and Management, 99; Environmental Sciences, 451-500; Biological Sciences, 551-600. Times Higher Education (2025): Arts and Humanities, 301-400; Life Sciences, 601-800. Scimago Institutional Rankings (2025): Anthropology, 367; Animal Science and Zoology, 824.

== New species ==
Several new species of primate, and one new genus, have been described by researchers working in the Primate Conservation programme, including

- Kayan Slow Loris Nycticebus kayan, Munds, Nekaris & Ford, 2013
- Mount Kenya Potto Perodicticus potto stockleyi Butynski & De Jong, 2007
- Rondo Dwarf Galago Galagoides rondoensis Honess in Kingdon, 1997
- Udzungwa Dwarf Galago Galagoides zanzibaricus udzungwensis Honess in Kingdon, 1997
- Makandé Squirrel Galago Sciurocheirus makandensis Ambrose, 2013
- Angolan Dwarf Galago Galagoides kumbirensis Svensson, Bersacola, Mills, Munds, Nijman, Perkin, Masters, Couette, Nekaris & Bearder, 2017
- Pygmy loris Xanthonycticebus Nekaris & Nijman, 2022

Description and resurrection of

- Northern pygmy loris Xanthonycticebus intermedius (Dao Van Tien, 1960)
- Southern pygmy loris Xanthonycticebus pygmaeus (Bonhote, 1907)

== Research groups ==
- The Nocturnal Primate Research Group
- The Oxford Wildlife Trade Research Group

== Honorary doctorates ==
Several prominent conservationists and primatologist have received honorary doctorates from Oxford Brookes University, including

- Sir David Attenborough (2003)
- Charlotte Uhlenbroek (2007), HonDSci
- Ian Redmond, OBE (2011), HonDSci
- Alison Cronin, MBE (2018), HonDSci
