= C'mon Billy =

Single by PJ Harvey

from the album To Bring You My Love
- B-side: "Darling Be There" / "Maniac" / "One Time Too Many"
- Released: 3 July 1995
- Studio: Townhouse Studios (London, England)
- Genre: Alternative rock; country
- Length: 2:52
- Label: Island
- Songwriter: PJ Harvey
- Producers: Flood; John Parish; PJ Harvey

PJ Harvey singles chronology
"Down by the Water" (1995)	"C'mon Billy" (1995)	"Send His Love to Me" (1995)

Alternate cover

Music video
- "C'mon Billy" on YouTube

"C'mon Billy" is a song by the English musician PJ Harvey, released on 3 July 1995 as the second single from her third studio album, To Bring You My Love (1995). Produced, engineered, and mixed by Flood with Harvey as co-producer and engineer, it features the artist on vocals and guitar, John Parish on drums and percussion, Joe Gore on guitar, Sonia Slany on violin, Jocelyn Pook and Jules Singleton on viola, and Sian Bell on cello. The string arrangement is by Pete Thomas. The song is cited as being a clear example of Harvey's sound change since breaking from the PJ Harvey Trio.

The lyrics talk about a woman begging for 'Billy' to come home and meet his son. Harvey's singing style has been described as "frantic purrs”.

== Critical reception ==
The single has been described as a clear example of Harvey's sound change; critics have stated that it was possibly a "glimpse of the Blues Explosion and Portishead." It peaked at No. 29 on the UK chart, and had moderate airplay there.

== Music video ==
The accompanying music video shows PJ Harvey as an old-time performer in an old theater-dining setting, described by one scholar as "surreal". There, she attempts to seduce a bald man in the setting while singing the song. The video switches to a version of her in a modern red dress, her face stained with tears. There is a scene with her apparently in her bedroom, on a mattress on a twin-sized bed without sheets, shot from the ceiling. The video eventually shows a home movie of Billy, Harvey (minus her previous make-up) and a baby boy, playing together outdoors in happier times.

The Chicago Tribune's Greg Kot described Harvey in the video as a "sadomasochistic dominatrix in blood-red dress". (Note: Kot appears to have conflated the color of the dress in the music video for "C'mon Billy" with Harvey's previous music video for "Down by the Water", in which she wears a red satin dress; in the "C'mon Billy" video, she wears a black dress.) Although the video impressed VH1 executives, they refused to air it because the video was seen as scary and off-putting. Kot wrote that it "blew away everyone in the room and every video aired that day, but was rejected. 'She's amazing,' one VH1 executive remarked, 'and way too good for us.'"

== Track list ==
1. "C'mon Billy" – 2:52
2. "Darling Be There" – 3:46
3. "Maniac" – 4:01
4. "One Time Too Many" – 2:51

== Chart positions ==
Chart (1995)	Peak position
Australian Singles Chart	128
UK Singles Chart	29
Europe (Eurochart Hot 100)	95
