= Mr. Lucky (Pete Thomas album) =

Mr Lucky

Compilation album by Pete Thomas
- Released: 12 March 2007
- Genre: Jazz
- Length: 54:47
- Label: Mermaid

Professional ratings
Review scores
Source	Rating
The Times	(not rated) Read
Independent on Sunday	(not rated) Read

Mr Lucky is a retrospective album by Pete Thomas. It was officially released on 12 March 2007, but was available to purchase on 25 October 2006 at his website.

== Track listing ==
1. "Stick It To 'Em" - 03:48 - Theme music from Monkey Business (TV series)
2. "Voodoo Chill" - 03:42
3. "Letters From Paris" - 03:17 - Features the Electra String Quartet
4. "Jazzbo In The Jungle" - 03:17
5. "The Organisation" - 03:33 - Commission for a Dry Blackthorn Cider commercial
6. "Cookin' with Lee" - 02:56 - Features Lee Allen on tenor sax
7. "Another Night In The Naked City" - 04:09 - Originally featured in a Tenants Pilsner commercial
8. "Tang" - 02:58
9. "Mr Lucky's Gumbo" - 03:29
10. "Laid Back And Blue" - 03:32
11. "Bodacity" - 03:00 - Originally featured in the Michael Caine movie Blue Ice
12. "Ooh Ah Ooh" - 02:56 - Featured on Nick Jr. (UK)
13. "Catch 23" - 03:58 - Originally commissioned for a biopic feature film about George Best
14. "One For Tiny" - 02:52 - Features Lee Allen with a tenor sax solo
15. "Hard Hat Area" - 04:20
16. "Mango Banana" - 02:53

== Musicians ==

- Pete Thomas – saxophone, flute, guitar
- Guy Barker – trumpet
- Evan Jolly – trumpet
- Bob Tinker – trumpet
- Ashley Slater – trombone
- Annie Whitehead – trombone
- Lee Allen – tenor saxophone
- Frank Dawkins – guitar
- Dave Marchant – guitar
- Chris Pearce – guitar
- Ben Waters – piano
- Geraint Watkins – piano
- Pete Wingfield – piano, organ
- Anthony Kerr – vibraphone
- Malcolm Creese – double bass
- Steve Rose – double bass
- Paul Riley – bass guitar
- Roy Dodds – drums
- Paul Robinson – drums
- Mark Townson – congas

== Bonus material ==
The CD contains a computer-readable data portion featuring:

- All audio tracks in computer file format, ready for an MP3 player
- The full-length version of the video of audio track 2 - Voodoo Chill

== Video ==
The Voodoo Chill video was filmed at

- Shepperton Studios in Middlesex
- Poland Street car park, Soho
- The Diorama
- The Sea Life Centre in Weymouth
- The River Itchen, Hampshire.

The saxophone on the video is a tenor, whereas the saxophone being played is a baritone. Also featuring Chris Pearce on guitar.
