= Charlie Horse =

Australian band

Charlie Horse is a band based in Sydney, Australia. The group formed in 2010, and as of 2013 had released two albums, I Hope I'm Not A Monster in 2012 on Laughing Outlaw Records and Strange Passengers on Plus One Records in 2013. They released an EP in 2011 titled I Killed My Mind and three singles with accompanying film clips, "I Killed My Mind", "Dead Roses", and "Deep Water".

== Biography ==
The band formed after Paul McDonald and Crystal Rose met in a Balmain pub in 2010. Finding that they shared musical tastes, the duo began to write music together. After writing enough material for an EP, the duo visited Edinburgh and returned to Australia where they built a studio in a log cabin in the Blue Mountains. It was here that their debut album and follow up album were completed and recorded.

== Music ==
The band were often labelled alt country because of their first album, I Hope I'm Not A Monster. Their second album, Strange Passengers, drew comparisons to PJ Harvey, the Drones, Patti Smith and Crazy Horse. Both albums have received positive reviews in Rolling Stone magazine, The Sydney Morning Herald, Rhythms Magazine and street press including Doubtful Sounds and The Music.

== Recent activity ==
Having spent the majority of 2013 touring their album Strange Passengers through Australia and New Zealand with artists such as Swervedriver, Stan Ridgway, Ash and Peter Murphy of Bauhaus fame, the band members planned to tour internationally in 2014. In August 2013, as part of the Brisbane Powerhouse Long Player Sessions, the band played PJ Harvey's album To Bring You My Love in full.

== Band members ==
- Crystal Rose - vocals
- Paul McDonald - guitar, vocals
- Matt Brown - drums, vocals
- Peter Caro - guitar
- Chris Familton - bass

== Discography ==
- I Hope I'm Not A Monster
- Strange Passengers, 2013
