= Siam Amazing Park =

Amusement and water park in the Khan Na Yao District of Bangkok, Thailand

- Previously known as Suansiam
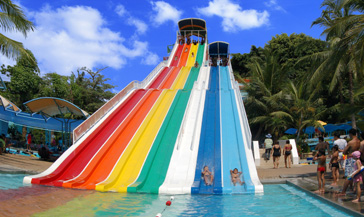
- Siam Amazing Park in Thailand
- Interactive map of Siam Amazing Park
- Location: Khan Na Yao, Bangkok, Thailand
- Coordinates: 13.805242°N 100.697229°E
- Status: Currently closed, aprox. date reopened 14 April 2027
- Opened: November 19, 1980; 45 years ago
- Operated by: Siam Park Bangkok Co., Ltd
- Operating season: Year-round
- Attendance: 2016 >2.000.000
- Area: 119 acres (48 ha)

Attractions
- Total: >30
- Website: www.siamamazingpark.com

Siam Amazing Park (Thai: สยามอะเมซิ่งพาร์ค), more commonly known as Siam Park City or Suansiam (สวนสยาม, RTGS: Suan Sayam, pronounced [sǔa̯n sā.jǎːm]), is an amusement and water park located in the Khan Na Yao district of Bangkok, Thailand. It was founded in November 1980 and remains the oldest amusement and water park complex in Southeast Asia. Located near Bangkok's Suvarnabhumi Airport, it contains attractions such as Southeast Asia's first suspended looping coaster with five inversions, a large wave pool and seven-story slides.

== Park history ==
Siam Park City is an amusement park in Khan Na Yao District of Bangkok. The park is spread over 100 acres, divided into a water park and an amusement park. The water park includes seven attractions, including a 13,600-square-metre wave pool certified as the world's largest by the Guinness World Records since 2009. The amusement park contains around 40 rides, including Vortex, one of the largest suspended roller-coasters and Giant Drop, a free-fall ride.

The park was constructed by a group of Thai elites and later established by the real-estate developer Chaiwat Luangamornlert.

Siam Park City was opened on November 19, 1980 under the name of "Suansiam" as the first water park in Thailand. The park began with a water park and a few rides, but it was later expanded and the slogan was changed to "World of Eternal Fun and Happiness". The park now has two million visitors a year and has some of the largest rides in the region.

Siam Park City is not only the first park opened in Thailand, it is also the longest-running park in the country.

In the fourth quarter of 2019, Siam Park City was rebranded as Siam Amazing Park, although locals still refer to it by its original name.

== Areas and attractions ==
- Water Park with a Wave Pool, Flowing Pool, Speed Slide, Super Spiral, Mini Slide, Kidz ProRacer, Kidz MiniRiver, Kidz Twister, RideHouse and Spa.
- Amusement Park with approximately 30 rides including Vortex, Boomerang, Log Flume, Giant Drop, Si-Am Tower and Grand Canyon Express.
- Museum and Family Ride comprises Dinotopia, Jurassic Adventure, and Africa Adventure.
- Event Facilities designed to support events of all sizes.
- Scout Camp

== Theme Park attractions ==
- Vortex
  The first suspended roller coaster in Southeast Asia. This model is a 765m Extended w/ Helix Vekoma SLC is 765 meters long with five inversions.
- Giant Drop
  an Intamin 75-meter free-fall drop tower ride.
- Boomerang
  This model is Vekoma's classic Boomerang (3 inversions).
- Log Flume
  The park's newest attraction.
- Topspin
  Launches riders up to the sky and then spins them in and out of connected fountains.
- Si-Am Tower
  A 109-meter high HUSS observation tower which offers a 360-degree panorama of Bangkok.
- Mega Dance
  A HUSS rare Mega Dance ride that swings riders around with its spider-like arms.
- Double-Deck Merry-Go-Round
  One of the first attractions installed at the park and is a double-decker merry-go-round.
- Twin Dragon
  Pirate ship ride with a dragon theme.
- Africa Adventure
  One of the newest additions to the park. Riders can choose to go on either a boat or train trip around the Island, seeing animatronics of tigers, elephants, and even King Kong.
- Jurassic Adventure
  A Jeep ride into the world of ancient creatures. Using Animatronics, riders will see over 30 different species of dinosaurs and an exploding volcano.
- Dinotopia
  Dinosaur museum. Here riders will learn the history behind these amazing creatures.
- Condor
  Spinning ride that launches riders 24 meters into the sky.
- Aladdin
  A flying carpet with centrifugal spin.
- Astrofighter
- Trabant
  UFO-themed thrill ride.
- Enterprise
  360-degree thrill ride without any safety belts.
- Astro-Liner
  Space-themed flight simulator.
- Monster
  Spinning thrill ride for adults.
- Rock & Roll
- Tagada Disco
  Spinning giant plate ride, featuring high G-force levels.
- Big-Double Shock
  A haunted house tour.
- Balloon Race
  A ride that opened in 2009.

== Water Park attractions ==
- Talay Krung Thep

The world's biggest wave pool with cascading waterfalls and numerous rock pools.

- Speed Slides

The 75 feet high slider that was recorded as the tallest water slide in the world in 1970.

- Super Spiral

4 integrated spiraling slides at varying levels.

- Lazy River

The flowing river moving throughout the water park.

- Spa Club

The health spa club with original Thai massage.

== Honors and awards ==
Largest wave pool

On 30 April 2009, Guinness World Records adjudication executive Talal Omar formally recognized the 13,600-m2 (146,389-ft2) wave pool at the Siam Park City leisure park in Bangkok, Thailand, as the largest on the planet at a ceremony hosted by Veerasak Kowsurat, President of the Board of Directors of the Tourism Authority of Thailand. Kowsurat and Chaiwat Luangamornlert, owner and Chairman of Siam Park City Co., Ltd, received the official Guinness World Records certificate at the event, which took place alongside the sprawling wave pool. According to Siam Park City representatives, the wave pool has sometimes been called Bangkok’s inland sea for nearly 30 years and is a very popular attraction in the park.

Outstanding Performance for Recreational Attraction and Entertainment On 27 September 2010, Siam Park City received an award for outstanding contribution to the entertainment business by the Tourism Authority of Thailand.

== Notable events ==
- 1985 final Miss Thailand contest
- Carabao National Service Concert – 6 July 1986
- Non-title boxing match between Sot Chitalada vs. Moon Jin Choi from South Korea – 30 August 1986
- Exhibit lantern puppets and dinosaur skeletons from Zigong, Sichuan Province, China – late 1992 to late 1993
- In 1993 Michael Jackson visited Siam Park during his Dangerous World Tour.
- MV Koi Suru Fortune Cookie (Thai version) of BNK48 – 4 November 2017

== Accidents ==
In October 2007, one woman was killed and another six were injured when the Indiana Log Slide ride malfunctioned due to an electrical shortage. This ride has been removed by the park. In March 2008, 24 children were injured when the Super Spiral Waterslide collapsed when a joint broke loose.

== Former attractions ==
About two decades, a railway circled the area of the park. This railway is now out of use, but the trains are still kept at the former roofed storage sidings.

== See also ==
- Dream World (Thai amusement park)
- Safari World
