= Monkey Life =

- Genre: Documentary Series
- Directed by: Claudia Riccio / Natalie Wilkinson
- Narrated by: Ralf Little; Andy Serkis
- Composer: Joseph Metcalfe
- Country of origin: United Kingdom
- No. of series: 18
- No. of episodes: 354 (4 specials)

Production
- Production locations: Dorset, United Kingdom
- Running time: 30 mins
- Production company: Primate Planet Productions Ltd / Athena Films

Original release
- Network: Channel 5 Animal Planet
- Release: 2007 – present

Related
- Monkey Business; 10 Years of Monkey Business

Monkey Life is a TV series based on the work of the largest monkey and ape rescue centre/sanctuary in the world: Monkey World in Dorset, United Kingdom. The series is a follow-on from the original ITV series Monkey Business, and shows the day-to-day work and troubles of the staff.

== Series overview ==
The series follows the work of the staff at Monkey World, who have rescued primates being mistreated in laboratories, being kept as exotic pets, or used as photographers' props etc. The sanctuary, which was originally a small and derelict pig farm, is now home to over 250 primates from 21 different species and has animals rescued from 18 countries.

The TV series is now in its fifteenth series and is filmed by Primate Planet Productions Ltd., who are based on-site and accompany Dr. Alison Cronin and her staff on all international and UK rescues, documenting the team's work in their ongoing mission to stop the illegal smuggling of primates from the wild. The Primate Planet Productions crew helps to document the rescue and re-homing of primates at Monkey World, and continues to follow their stories as the primates settle into their new home along with other animals of their kind.

The Animal Planet stopped showing the series starting from series eight. According to the Dorset Echo, "The programme is one of the longest running docu-soaps on TV as its former incarnation, Monkey Business, first appeared on screens in 1998."

== Monkey Life – Series 1–18 (354 half-hour episodes) so far ==
- Series 18 (2025): Primate Planet Productions produced 20 half-hour episodes for Sky. Narrated by Ralf Little. This series aired on Sky Nature.
- Series 17 (2024): Primate Planet Productions produced 20 half-hour episodes for Sky. Narrated by Ralf Little. This series aired on Sky Nature.
- Series 16 (2023): Primate Planet Productions produced 20 half-hour episodes for Sky. Narrated by Ralf Little. This series aired on Sky Nature.
- Series 15 (2022): Primate Planet Productions produced 20 half-hour episodes for Sky. Narrated by Ralf Little. This series aired on Sky Nature
- Series 14 (2021): Primate Planet Productions produced 20 half-hour episodes for Sky. Narrated by Ralf Little. This series aired on Sky Nature.
- Series 13 (2020): Primate Planet Productions produced 20 half-hour episodes for Sky. Narrated by Ralf Little. This series aired on Sky Nature.
- Series 12 (2019): Primate Planet Productions produced 20 half-hour episodes for Sky. Narrated by Ralf Little, this series is broadcast on Pick.
- Series 11 (2018): Primate Planet Productions produced 20 half-hour episodes for Sky. Narrated by Ralf Little, this series is broadcast on Pick.
- Series 10 (2018): Primate Planet Productions produced 20 half-hour episodes for Sky. Narrated by Ralf Little, this series is broadcast on Pick.
- Series 9 (2016): Primate Planet Productions produced 20 half-hour episodes for Sky. Narrated by Ralf Little, this series is broadcast on Pick.
- Series 8 (2015): Primate Planet Productions produced 20 half-hour episodes for Sky. Narrated by Ralf Little, this series is broadcast on Pick.
- Series 7 (2013): Primate Planet Productions produced 20 half-hour episodes for Discovery Networks. Narrated by Ralf Little, this series is broadcast on Animal Planet and other channels worldwide.
- Series 6 (2012): Primate Planet Productions produced 20 half-hour episodes for Discovery Networks. Narrated by Ralf Little, this series is broadcast on Animal Planet and other channels worldwide.
- Series 5 (2011): Primate Planet Productions produced 20 half-hour episodes for Discovery Networks. Narrated by Ralf Little, this series is broadcast on Animal Planet and other channels worldwide, as well as Channel 5 in Ireland and the UK.
- Series 4 (2010): Primate Planet Productions produced 20 half-hour episodes. Narrated by Ralf Little, this series is broadcast on Nat Geo WILD worldwide, as well as on Channel 5 in Ireland and the UK.
- Series 3 (2009): Primate Planet Productions produced 20 half-hour episodes in Association with Athena Films. Narrated by Ralf Little, this series was shown on Channel 5 in Ireland and the UK, as well as on Animal Planet worldwide.
- Series 2 (2008): Primate Planet Productions produced 20 half-hour episodes in Association with Athena Films. Narrated by Ralf Little, this series was shown on Channel 5 in Ireland and the UK, as well as on Animal Planet worldwide. This series was also made available on Hulu in the USA.
- Series 1 (2007): Primate Planet Productions produced 14 half-hour episodes in association with Athena Films. Narrated by Andy Serkis, (the voice of Gollum in Lord of the Rings), this series was shown on Channel 5 in the UK, as well as on Animal Planet worldwide. This was the only series to feature Jim Cronin, a co-founder of Monkey World, as he died on 17 March 2007 from cancer.

== Merchandise ==
=== DVDs ===
Monkey Life series 1–11 have been released on DVD and are available worldwide. Series 1-3, and series 4-6 are available as 3 series sets, while series 1-11 are all available individually. They are all presented in stereo sound, widescreen video and are region-free.

== Monkey Life on Demand ==
In 2014, Primate Planet Productions launched the series on Vimeo VOD. Monkey Life series 1–10 are available on VIMEO VOD in many countries around the world.

== Monkey Business ==
Monkey Business, the series that preceded Monkey Life, was first produced by Tigress and then Meridian Broadcasting. Nine series were produced and were broadcast in full on the local ITV stations Meridian TV and Channel TV in the UK between January 1998 and October 2006, and also on Animal Planet and its sister channels worldwide. The series was partly shown in a handful of other ITV regions and briefly on Channel 4.

A final 3-part TV series called 10 Years of Monkey Business summarised the work of Monkey World over the previous 10 years. Monkey Business was narrated by Chris Serle.

== Jim Cronin ==
The late Jim Cronin founded Monkey World Ape Rescue Centre in 1987, and brought Jeremy Keeling on board as animal director, while Jim made it his mission to grow the rescue operation, design & build new facilities and educate visitors about the park's purpose & vision. During his life Cronin established himself as an international expert in the rescue and rehabilitation of abused primates, as well as the enforcement of international treaties aimed at protecting primates from illegal trade, exploitation and abuse.

Cronin died on 17 March 2007. In his memory, the Jim Cronin Memorial Fund has been established to continue Cronin's legacy, supporting primate conservation and welfare around the world. Assisted by Jeremy Keeling and the rest of the team at Monkey World, Jim's wife Alison Cronin continues Jim's work.
