= Dream World (Thailand) =

Theme park in Thailand

Dream World ดรีมเวิลด์
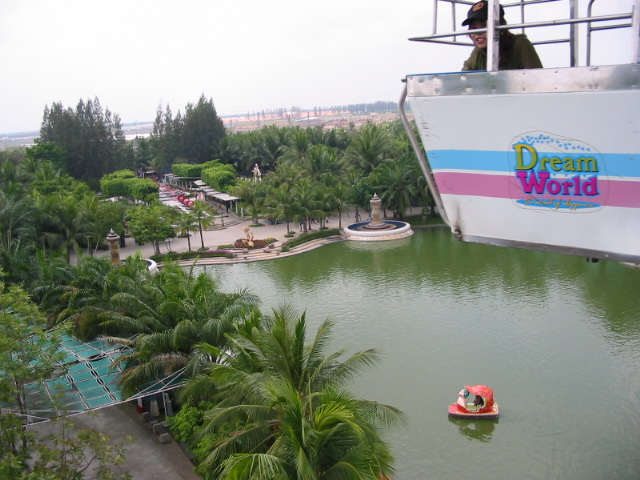
- Interactive map of Dream World ดรีมเวิลด์
- Location: Thanyaburi, Pathum Thani, Thailand
- Coordinates: 13°59′15″N 100°40′30″E
- Opened: November 12, 1993; 32 years ago
- Owner: Kitipraporn family
- Operated by: Amusement Creation Co., Ltd
- Slogan: The World of Happiness
- Operating season: Year-round
- Attendance: 2 million (2014)
- Area: 63 acres (25 ha)
- Website: dreamworld.co.th

Dream World (Thai: ดรีมเวิลด์, pronounced [drīːm wɤ̄ːw, –wɤ̄ːɫ]) is an amusement park in Thanyaburi district, Pathum Thani province, Thailand. The park includes three roller coasters and multiple other rides and attractions.

== History ==
Established by the Kitiparaphon family, it was opened to the public on 12 November 1993. Across approximately 25 hectares, the park is divided into four distinct zones.

== Attractions ==
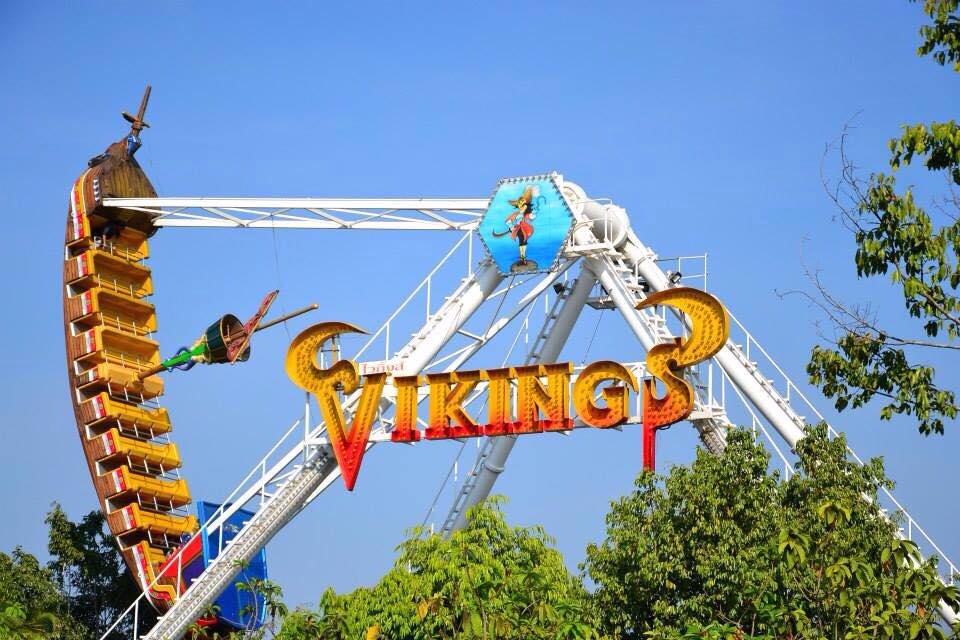
Vikings

The four zones of the park are: Dream World Plaza, Dream Gardens, Fantasy Land, and Adventure Land. The interior of the park is filled with over 40 imported thrill rides and family attractions. The park's main attraction is a hanging roller coaster, which is in the middle of Adventure Land, and a model of the Grand Canyon as part of a river rafting attraction.

=== Dream World Plaza ===
This includes the main entrance to the park and an area modeled after Disneyland's Main Street USA. It is filled with shops and buildings that are fantasy-themed.

=== Dream Garden ===
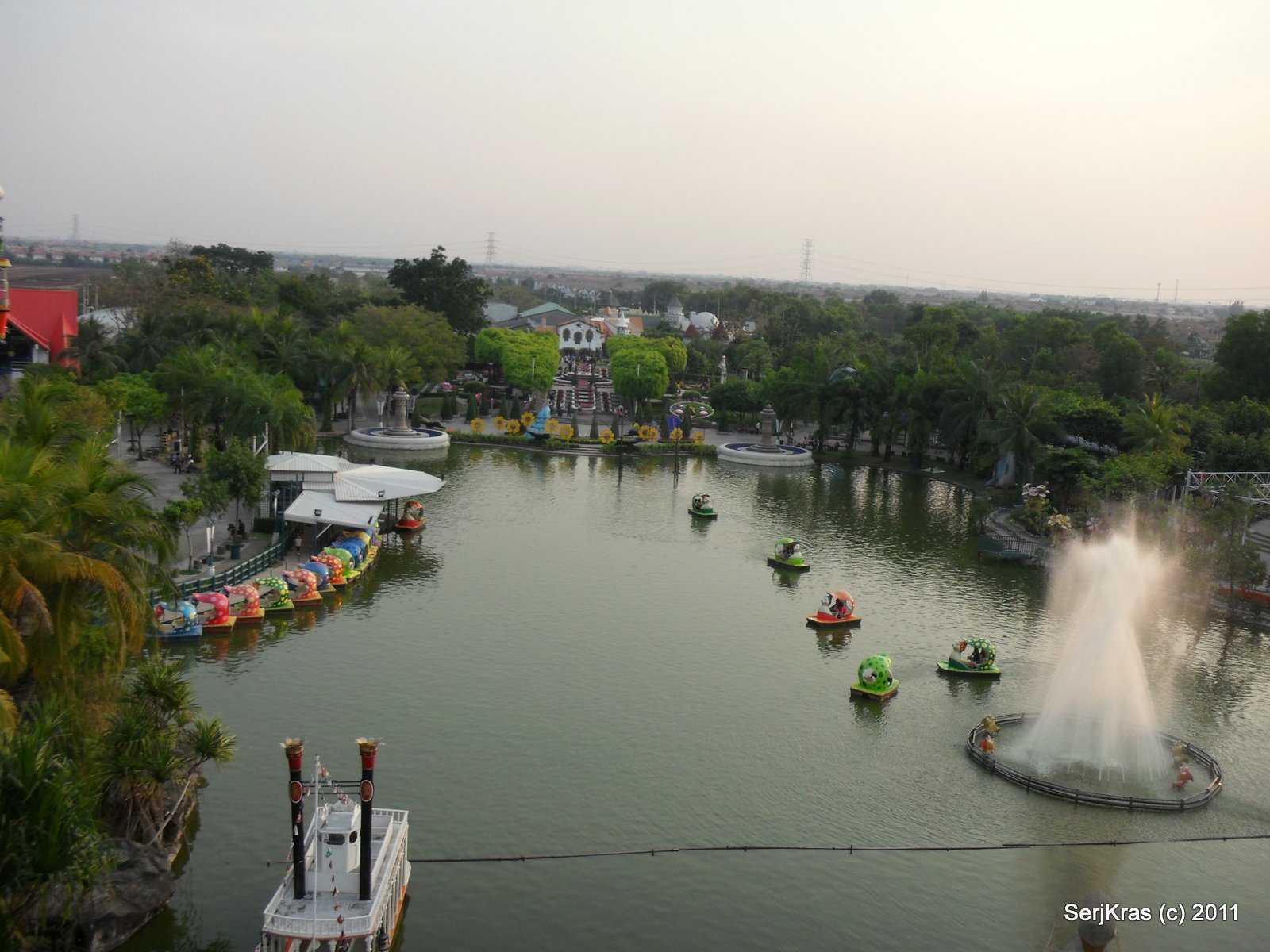
Bicycle Boat

Dream Garden has a nature theme. This area surrounds a lake near the Dream World Plaza.

List of attractions:

- Cable Car
- Seven Wonders of the World
- Speedy Mouse
- Bicycle Boat

=== Fantasy Land ===
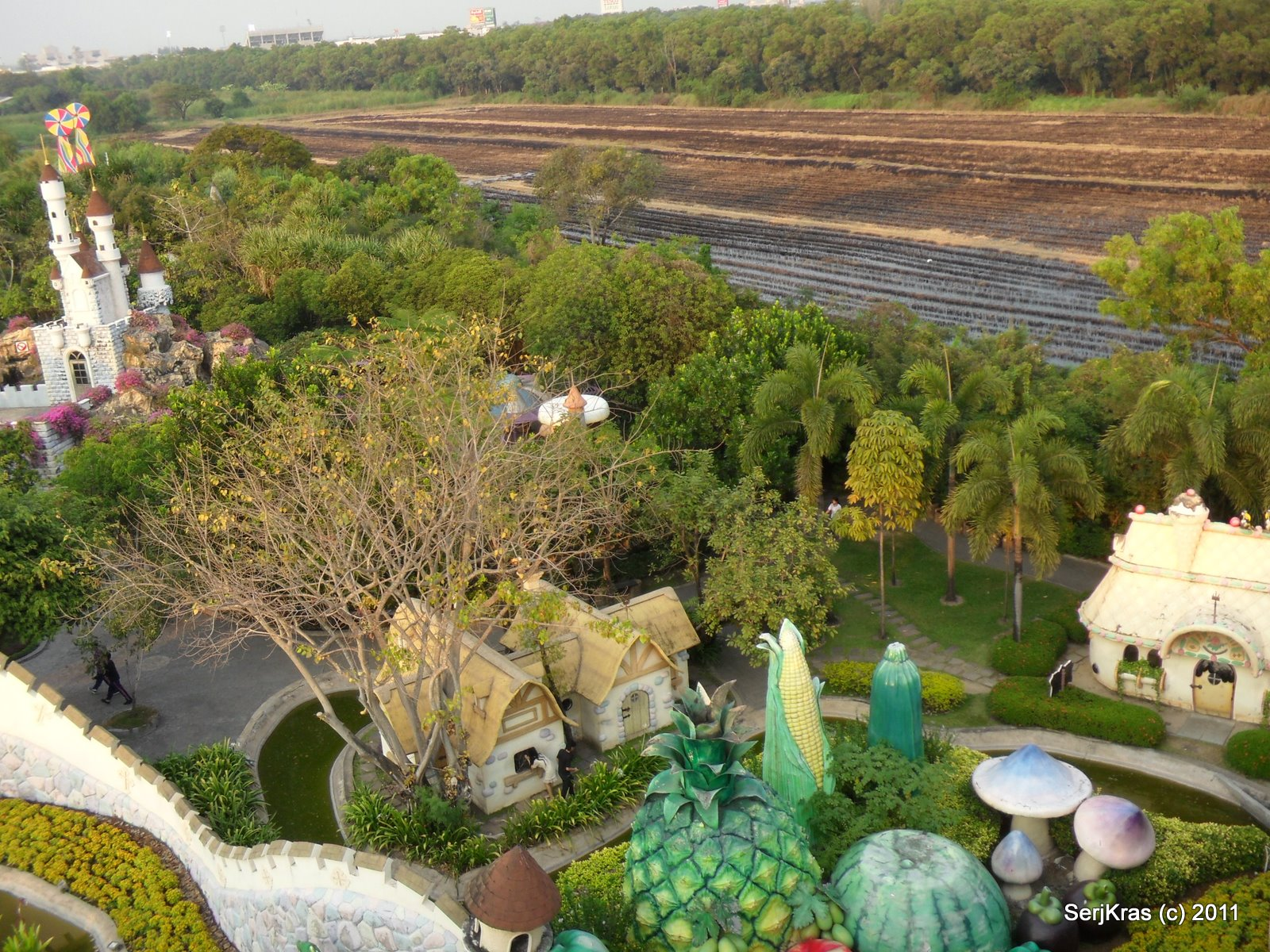
Fantasy Land

This area is the park's "Fairy World" themed section. It is in the middle of the park.

List of attractions:

- Fantasy Garden
- The Giant House
- Sightseeing Train
- Sleeping Beauty's Castle
- Hurricane the Ride
- The Spider
- Uncle Tom's Farm
- 4D Adventure

=== Adventure Land ===
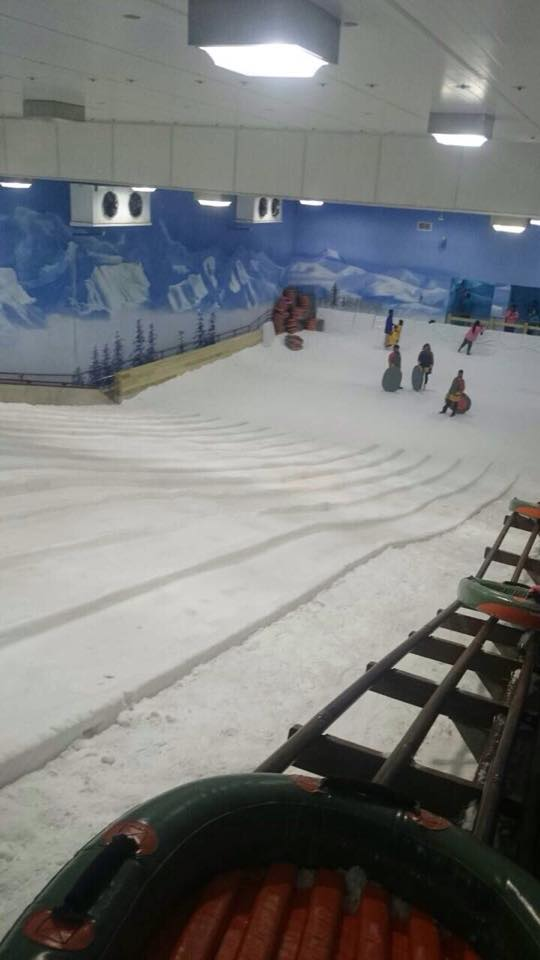
Snow world

Adventure Land is the largest zone of the theme park. This area has thrill rides and attractions, and its theme is space exploration and the future.

List of attractions:

- Grand Canyon
- Super Plash
- The Thunderbirds
- Haunted Mansion
- Crazy Bus
- Monorail Tour
- Bumper Boats
- Antique Cars
- Go Karts Track
- Flying Carpets
- Black Hole Coaster
- Sky Coaster (Former: Hanging Coaster)
- Vikings
- Bumper Cars
- Flying Fishes
- Hollywood's Action Show
- Red Indian's Boat
- Raptor
- Tornado

== Development ==
- 1995: Installed "Super Splash" from the United States.
- 1996: Installed "Magic Carpet" from Italy. Installed "Raptor" from Germany. Installed "Kart" from the United States.
- 1997: "Snow town", the first of its kind in Thailand. Installed "Snow Ski Flying" from the United States.
- 2000: installed "Hurricane" from Germany. Installed the "Octopus" from Germany.
- 2001: Installed the "Grand Canyon" from the United States.
- 2002: Celebrated 10 years of Dreamworld.
- 2007: Switched the original Hanging coaster train to the Vekoma Floorless style train and renamed to "Sky Coaster".
- 2009: Celebrated 15 years of Dreamworld. Installed "4D Adventure” Theater.
- 2010: Equipped with "Aliens".
- 2011: Park closed on 21 October 2011 due to flooding
- 2012: Park reopens 10 January 2012. Installed "Tornado" from Italy.
- 2013: Installed "Water Fun" which is a water park with the large Aquatic Play Structure.
- 2014: Installed Mini Zoo, An "Animal Farm"
- After 2014: Installed Giant Castle

== See also ==
- Safari World
- Siam Park City
