= Jim Cronin =

Jim or James Cronin may refer to:

- Jim Cronin (zookeeper) (1951–2007), founder of Monkey World, Dorset, England, a sanctuary for abused and neglected primates
- Jim Cronin (baseball) (1905–1983), American Major League Baseball infielder
- Jim Cronin (soccer) (1906–1942), American soccer player
- James Cronin (1931–2016), American particle physicist
- James Cronin (rugby union) (born 1990), Irish rugby union player
- James Cronin, founder of the Ceroc dance club
