= Inchicronan Priory =

Monastery in County Clare, Ireland

- Chrónáin
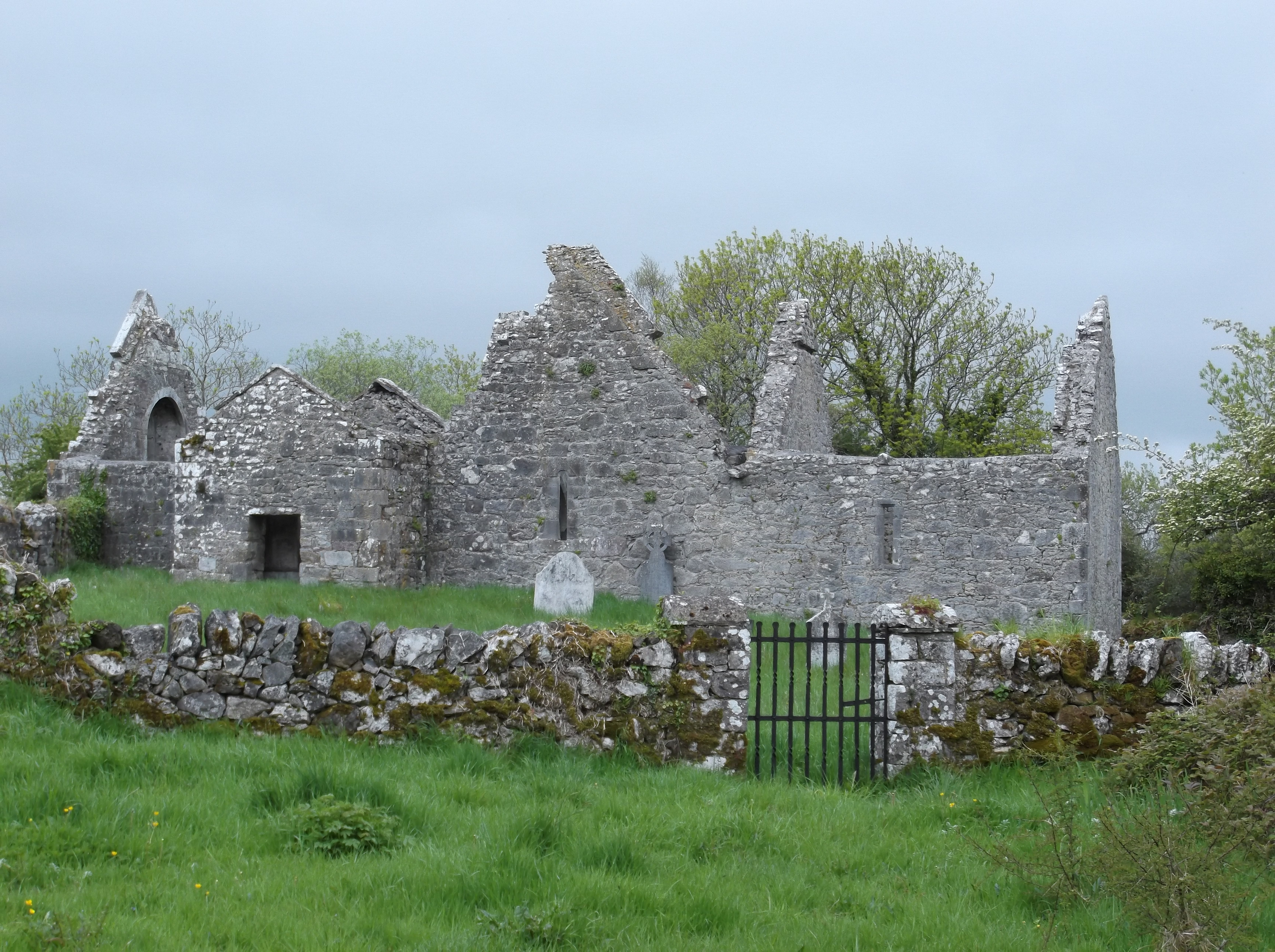

- Location within Ireland

Religion
- Affiliation: Augustinian Pre-Reformation Catholic

Location
- Interactive map of Inchicronan Priory
- Coordinates: 52°55′05″N 8°54′24″W

Architecture
- Groundbreaking: 6th century
- Materials: sandstone

Inchicronan Priory (Irish: Prióireacht Inse Chrónáin is an early monastic site in County Clare, Ireland. It is on Inchicronan in Inchicronan Lough.

The abbey was possibly founded in the 6th century by patron St Cronan of Tuamgraney Crusheen. It was re-founded about 1198 by Donald O'Brien, (King of Limerick), as a daughter house of Clare Abbey.

It became a parish church in 1302 and was dissolved c.1543 by Henry VIII, but it was restored and in use by 'friars' in the reign of Elizabeth I and became a parish church again in 1615 when Donogh, Earl of Thomond granted it to Henry, Earl of Thomond.
