= Cronan (surname) =

Cronan is a surname of Irish origin derived from Ó Cróinín. It is a variant of Cronin.

== Notable people ==
- John P. Cronan, American attorney and federal district judge
- Michael Patrick Cronan (1951–2013), American graphic designer and artist
- Peter Cronan, American football player
- Phil Cronan, Australian rules footballer
- Selma Cronan (1913–2002), American aviator
- Thomas Cronan, American athlete
- William P. Cronan, Governor of Guam
- William S. Cronan, American Medal of Honor recipient

== See also ==
- Cronin, surname
