= John Cronin (convict) =

Scottish rapist and thief (born 1971)

John Cronin (born 18 July 1971) is a repeat-offence Scottish convict. Imprisoned for running up a 140,000 kronor (US$20,500) bill in one of Sweden's top restaurants and then refusing to pay, Cronin is infamous for a string of sex offences against women, most notably against "Judy X", a Conservative Party worker, in May 1992. On 20 March 2013 at Antrim Crown Court, Cronin pleaded guilty to the burglary of Drumalis House (a Retreat and Conference Centre in Antrim) on 15 February 2012 and the theft of money belonging to the Church.

Cronin is also the centre of current debate in Scotland over the reporting and handling of sex offenders and how they are dealt with once out of prison.

== History ==
Cronin was born in Edinburgh, the son of Michael Cronin (of Limerick, Ireland) and Jeanette Cronin (of East Lothian, Scotland). Cronin's early years were marked with frequent moves between East Lothian, Limerick, and the U.S. (where the elder Cronin was a member of the U.S. Army). In 1978, the Cronins moved back to East Lothian to care for Jeanette's father, who was ill. It was about this time they discovered that Cronin was in need of assistance.

By the age of three, he was already difficult for his parents to control, smashing light bulbs and breaking various things in the home. At age five, he was enrolled in a private school, but was expelled shortly thereafter for disruptive behaviour, including overturning desks, urinating on the floor and attacking teachers.

The remainder of his school years were said by Cronin to be filled with repeated difficulties; the exception to this pattern was between the ages six to eight, where he was educated by nuns at St Margaret's convent in Edinburgh, where he developed a deep respect for the nuns. He went through several schools, where he built up a record for repeat offences at the schools, from theft and assault to openly urinating and defecating on school property.

Cronin finally obtained four O-grades at a boarding school in Newton Stewart in 1989. Shortly after leaving the school he committed his first criminal act, sexually assaulting a 14-year-old female classmate, for which he served a three-month sentence.

=== Criminal record ===
Around this time Cronin discussed with a social worker his plans to take his father's military records and alter them so that he could join the IRA; it was later revealed that he tried to join another Irish terrorist group around that time.

There was a period between 1990 and 1992 that he served short prison sentences in Ireland for various crimes.

Sometime in the early 1990s, he began to pass himself off as a visiting Irish Catholic priest. His skill was competent enough that he was able to celebrate Mass with and to exploit genuine priests, often stealing from them after being given hospitality. In one case, he stole the purse of a janitor at St. Mary's Cathedral in Edinburgh after having fooled the monsignor present.

It was this guise he used when entering the home of Judy X, a Conservative Party activist on 21 May 1992. Posing as a priest who wished to donate money to the party, he came in and sexually assaulted her repeatedly as well as beating her with a fireplace poker. Arrested shortly afterwards, his trial was brief, and in August 1992, having been called by the Scottish High Court a "Walter Mitty gone mad", Cronin was sentenced to life in prison for the crime. A December 1992 appeal resulted in a six-year prison sentence.

Shortly after release from prison in 1997, he was jailed again, this time for making harassing phone calls and threats to various female politicians. By May 2005, he had been jailed repeatedly on various charges from petty theft to fraud to bank robbery in 2001. Cronin was severely bullied by other prisoners whilst serving a two-year sentence in Ireland's Cork Prison for the bank robbery, spending much of the time in voluntary solitary confinement. He was arrested for petty theft only hours after his release.

In August 2007 he ran up a $20,500 bill at the exclusive Operakällaren restaurant in Stockholm, Sweden. He ordered a three course meal, with a different bottle of wine for each course. When presented with the bill, he told waiters that he could not pay it, and asked them to call the police. He was sentenced to four months jail to be served in Sweden, after which he was deported, and banned from re-entering Sweden for 5 years.

He was considered enough of a threat that the East Lothian Police set up a special unit to deal exclusively with tracking Cronin.

== Analysis ==
From the earliest points of childhood, Cronin had been involved with mental health specialists.

=== Early years ===
At the age of four, he was sent to a child psychologist who later wrote that even from the beginning, "it was clear he was not one of us." Two years later, at age five, he was referred to the family psychiatry department of the Royal Hospital for Sick Children, Edinburgh, where he was considered to be highly aggressive and mercurial.

Cronin's school years expanded his psychiatric profile, with numerous instances of disruptive behaviour, most notably a 1987 incident when he was interned for a night at a psychiatric hospital in Edinburgh, after threatening to burn down a homeless shelter. In the case of the hospital stay, he became agitated and repeatedly threw faeces at a nurse.

=== Later years ===
Robert Waite, a psychiatrist who assessed Cronin in the wake of his first offence, found marked discrepancies in Cronin's intellectual abilities; his verbal skills operated at the university level, while his visual-spatial skills were below average. Cronin had revealed to Waite that he had felt suicidal while serving his sentence for the initial assault. Waite later concluded: "It is clear he has a severe disorder of his personality, which has grossly interfered with his social adjustment and might be expected to do so for some considerable time." During his discussions with the social worker, Cronin was said to be defiant and arrogant, interested in politics and expressing admiration for Nazism and dictatorship, which he felt was a form of true leadership.

Dr. John Baird, whose report on Cronin was instrumental in the initial 1992 life sentence, did a study on him. By this time, Cronin had a long criminal record and was considered by some psychiatrists as untreatable. Baird later wrote: "Regarding the question of dangerousness, his life-long behaviour pattern has been one of senseless, dishonest, unreliable and unacceptable behaviour. I have not been able to find any evidence of other behaviour similar to that which he displayed on 21 May 1992, when he committed a very serious and sustained sexual assault, nor have I been able to find any reason for his behaviour on that day."

Of the 1992 assault on Judy X, Cronin told Baird that in his mind, she had not been there, but instead, he was imagining an assault on his maternal grandfather, with whom he had a lengthy love-hate relationship. He did talk at length about his parents; though he knew he didn't have a good relationship with them, he described his father as a hero, while disparaging and almost disowning his mother.

Of other issues, Cronin told Baird of his need for prostitution and alcohol. Baird noted Cronin grew distressed only when discussing the 1992 attack or past abuse. Cronin also discussed with Baird his beliefs that he was reincarnated, that he'd been a soldier with the Charge of the Light Brigade. He also believed himself to be Nazi Reinhard Heydrich, as well as other persons in history.

Ultimately, Baird wrote that Cronin suffered no mental disorder that would justify institutionalising him. However, in his final notes, he added:

"[Cronin] has never, while in the community, lived in a calm, uneventful manner. The likelihood is that for a considerable time to come, he will, when in the community, behave again as he has done in the past...Personality disorders can cover a range of ills and affect different people in different ways. If a psychiatrist says such a condition is untreatable, it means there is no medication to help, but I don’t accept that any condition is entirely untreatable. There is work that could be done with John Cronin. The stumbling block is that he needs to want to be helped."

== Controversy ==
There has been some controversy over Cronin's case both with Cronin's treatment himself and the issues surrounding him.

=== Treatment ===
The initial criticism comes from neighbours of the Cronins during John's childhood, in that one neighbour reported that "[f]or the first few years of his life, his mum dressed him up as a girl. She wanted a girl so she dressed John in bows and frilly blouses. No wonder he’s such a mess now", a condition that persisted until the Cronins had a daughter in 1978.

There have also been questions regarding his relationship with his grandfather, whom Cronin claims sexually abused him during the ages of 5 to 12. This has been contradicted somewhat in cases where Cronin also referred to his grandfather as a confidant and friend.

Additionally, there has also been some controversy over his conversion to Islam while in prison. While some British Muslims welcomed his conversion, others have recalled that the 1992 Judy X incident was done while Cronin pretended to be a priest, and that conversion could be no more than a smokescreen. In particular, Dr Prem Misra, a psychiatrist at Parkhead Hospital in Glasgow, said: "He has used religious pretence to commit crime and nothing suggests that this will be different. He is remorseless."

In a similar vein is his response to his love of politics. Though initially involving himself with the Tories, in his later years he involved himself with the British National Party, though due to issues in 2003 regarding fraud charges the BNP announced that they had denied him membership and would campaign to have him evicted from his then-residence.

Lastly is media controversy. Several Scottish media outlets have followed his case, leading to some criticism of overzealotry and stalking. Scottish News of the World reported that vigilantes threatened to lynch him, while reporters from The Sun exposed his home, reporting that they found "the monster in hiding" and printed a picture of where Cronin was "holed up." Another tabloid printed on its front page a plea to "HELP US KEEP TABS ON THE BEAST. Women and children are living in fear because sick Cronin is to walk free. Help us to keep them safe by telling us what you know of his whereabouts."
