= Lucky Man =

Lucky Man may refer to:

== Film and television ==
- A Lucky Man, a 1930 American Spanish-language film
- Lucky Man (1995 film), an Indian Tamil-language film
- Lucky Man (2022 film), an Indian Kannada-language film
- Lucky Man (2023 film), an Indian Tamil-language film
- Stan Lee's Lucky Man, a 2016–2018 British television series
- "Lucky Man" (Doctors), a 2003 television episode

== Music ==
=== Albums ===
- Lucky Man (Charlie Major album), 1995
- Lucky Man (Dave Koz album), 1993
- Lucky Man (Hal Ketchum album), 1991
- Lucky Man (Bobby album), 2021

=== Songs ===
- "Lucky Man" (Emerson, Lake & Palmer song), 1970
- "Lucky Man" (Montgomery Gentry song), 2007
- "Lucky Man" (The Verve song), 1997
- "Lucky Man", by Arashi from How's It Going?, 2003
- "Lucky Man", by Bruce Springsteen from Tracks, 1998
- "Lucky Man", by Hurricane No. 1 from Hurricane No. 1, 1997
- "Lucky Man", by Lynyrd Skynyrd from Vicious Cycle, 2003
- "Lucky Man", by Idle Race from Birthday Party, 1968
- "Lucky Man", by Mister Loco, 1976
- "Lucky Man", by Starbuck, 1976
- "Lucky Man", by Steve Miller Band from Sailor, 1968

== Other uses ==
- Lucky Man: A Memoir, a 2002 autobiography by Michael J. Fox
- Lucky Man Cree Nation, a Cree First Nation in Saskatchewan, Canada

== See also ==
- Lucky the Man a 2001 album by Wizz Jones
- O Lucky Man!, a 1973 film
- Lucky Man (manga), a 1993 Japanese manga and anime series
