= Brendan Cronin =

Brendan Cronin may refer to:

- Brendan Cronin (Gaelic footballer), see Billy Myers (Gaelic footballer)
- Brendan Cronin, character in Strangers (Dean Koontz novel)
