= Blue Ice (film) =

- Theatrical poster
- Directed by: Russell Mulcahy
- Written by: Ron Hutchinson
- Starring: Michael Caine; Sean Young; Bob Hoskins; Ian Holm
- Music by: Michael Kamen
- Production company: HBO Pictures
- Release dates: 9 October 1992 (United Kingdom); 31 July 1993 (United States)
- Running time: 100 minutes
- Countries: United Kingdom; United States
- Language: English
- Budget: $7 million

Blue Ice is a 1992 crime thriller film directed by Russell Mulcahy. The film stars Michael Caine and Sean Young.

== Premise ==
A former spy, who is a jazz club owner, becomes immersed back into the world of espionage and counter-intelligence.

== Cast ==
- Michael Caine as Harry Anders
- Sean Young as Stacy Mansdorf
- Ian Holm as Sir Hector
- Bob Hoskins as Sam Garcia
- Jack Shepherd as Stevens
- Bobby Short as Buddy
- Alun Armstrong as Osgood
- Alan MacNaughtan as Lewis Mandorf
- Sam Kelly as George
- Phil Davis as Westy
- Patricia Hayes as Old Woman

The band in Harry's club is portrayed by a number of accomplished musicians, including Rolling Stones drummer Charlie Watts:

- Tom Boyd - Oboe
- Dave Green - Bass
- Michael Kamen - Orchestrator
- Anthony Kerr - Vibes
- Peter King - Alto Sax
- Gerard Presencer - Trumpet
- Pete Thomas - Saxophone / Composer:additional music
- Charlie Watts - Drums
- Steve Williamson - Tenor Sax

== Production ==
According to the credits, the character of Harry Anders is based on the Ted Allbeury character Tad Anders. The character was featured in Allbeury's novels Snowball, Palomino Blonde and The Judas Factor. In the books he is described as being of Polish-British descent, while in the movie he is portrayed as English. The name is also an allusion to Harry Palmer, a British spy whom Caine portrayed in an earlier series of films.
