= Lee Cronin =

Lee Cronin may refer to:

- Lee Cronin (director), Irish film writer and director
- Leroy Cronin, chemist also known as Lee Cronin
- A pen name for Gene L. Coon
