= John Kieffer =

American mathematician

John Cronan Kieffer (born 1945) is an American mathematician best known for his work in information theory, ergodic theory, and stationary process theory.

== Education ==
Kieffer received his elementary and high school education in St Louis, Missouri, a bachelor's degree in applied mathematics in 1967 from University of Missouri Rolla, and a master's degree in mathematics in 1968 from University of Illinois Urbana-Champaign. In 1970, under Robert B. Ash, he received the Ph.D. degree in mathematics from University of Illinois Urbana-Champaign with thesis A Generalization of the Shannon-McMillan Theorem and Its Application to Information Theory.

== Work history ==
In 1970 Kieffer became an assistant professor at Missouri University of Science and Technology, where he eventually became a full professor. In 1986 he became a full professor at University of Minnesota Twin Cities. Kieffer held visiting appointments at Stanford University, University of Illinois Urbana-Champaign, ETH Zürich, and University of Arizona. He has been the supervisor for 6 Ph.D. theses.

== Professional activities ==
During the 1980s, Kieffer was Associate Editor of the IEEE Transactions on Information Theory. In 2004, Kieffer was co-editor of a special issue of the IEEE Transactions on Information Theory entitled "Problems on Sequences: Information Theory and Computer Science Interface". He is a Life Fellow of the Institute of Electrical and Electronics Engineers "for contributions to information theory, particularly coding theory and quantization".

== Key works ==
1. Key works on grammar-based coding:

- Kieffer, J.C.; Yang, En-Hui (2000), "Grammar-based codes: A new class of universal lossless source codes", IEEE Transactions on Information Theory, 46 (3): 737–754, doi:10.1109/18.841160
- Zhang, Jie; Yang, En-Hui; Kieffer, J.C. (2014), "A Universal Grammar-Based Code For Lossless Compression of Binary Trees", IEEE Transactions on Information Theory, 60 (3): 1373–1386, arXiv:1304.7392, Bibcode:2014ITIT...60.1373Z, doi:10.1109/TIT.2013.2295392, S2CID 13892229

2. Key works on channel coding:

- Kieffer, John C. (1974), "A general formula for the capacity of stationary nonanticipatory channels", Information and Control, 26 (4): 381–391, doi:10.1016/S0019-9958(74)80006-9
- Kieffer, J. C. (1981), "Block coding for weakly continuous channels", IEEE Transactions on Information Theory, 27 (6): 721–727, doi:10.1109/TIT.1981.1056422

3. Key works on quantization:

- Gray, R. M.; Kieffer, J. C.; Linde, Y. (1980), "Locally optimal block quantizer design", Information and Control, 45 (2): 178–198, doi:10.1016/S0019-9958(80)90313-7
- Kieffer, J. C. (1983), "Uniqueness of locally optimal quantizer for log-concave density and convex error weighting function", IEEE Transactions on Information Theory, 29 (1): 42–47, doi:10.1109/TIT.1983.1056622

4. Key works on ergodic theory:

- Kieffer, J. C. (1975), "A generalized Shannon-McMillan theorem for the action of an amenable group on a probability space", Annals of Probability, 3 (6): 1031–1037, doi:10.1214/aop/1176996230
- Kieffer, J. C. (1982), "A direct proof that VWB processes are closed in the $\bar{d}$-metric", Israel Journal of Mathematics, 41: 154–160, doi:10.1007/BF02760663, S2CID 121647911

5. Key works on stationary process theory:

- Gray, Robert M.; Kieffer, J. C. (1980), "Asymptotically Mean Stationary Measures", Annals of Probability, 8 (5): 962–973, doi:10.1214/aop/1176994624
- Kieffer, John C.; Rahe, Maurice (1981), "Markov channels are asymptotically mean stationary", SIAM Journal on Mathematical Analysis, 12 (3): 293–305, doi:10.1137/0512027

== Inventions ==
- Multilevel Pattern Matching Grammar-Based Code
- SEQUENTIAL Grammar-Based Code
- Longest-Match Grammar-Based Code

== Impact ==
Kieffer has over 70 journal publications in the mathematical sciences. His research work has attracted over 3000 Google Scholar citations, over 500 MathSciNet citations and over 1000 IEEE Xplore citations. Some of these works have been cited as prior art on various United States patents. In 1998, the IEEE Transactions on Information Theory published a special issue consisting of articles that survey research in information theory during 1948–1998. Two of these articles include discussions of Kieffer's work, namely, the article Lossy Source Coding by Toby Berger and Jerry Gibson, and the article Quantization by Robert M. Gray and David Neuhoff. In addition, the textbook Transmitting and Gaining Data by Rudolf Ahlswede presents several aspects of Kieffer's work.
