= Thomas Cronin (disambiguation) =

Thomas or Tommy Cronin may refer to:

- Thomas Cronin (born 1940), American political scientist
- Tommy Cronin (1896–1964), American football player
- Tommy Cronin (footballer) (born 1932), English footballer
- Dr. Thomas Cronin, American plastic surgeon and one of the inventors of the silicone breast implants
