= Salty Dog Blues =

Traditional song

"Salty Dog Blues" is a folk song from the early 1900s. Musicians have recorded it in a number of styles, including blues, jazz, country music, bluegrass. Papa Charlie Jackson recorded an adaptation for Paramount and Broadway in 1924. According to Jas Obrecht, "Old-time New Orleans musicians from Buddy Bolden’s era recalled hearing far filthier versions of 'Salty Dog Blues' long before Papa Charlie’s recording." Similar versions were recorded by Mississippi John Hurt and Lead Belly.

The Morris Brothers version includes "Let me be your Salty Dog, Or I won't be your man at all, Honey let me be your salty dog." According to Richard Matteson:

The Morris chord progression for Salty Dog was also used by other performers, leaving the Morris version as an arrangement at best. During the 1920s and 30s, many country performers claimed they wrote any song that they copyrighted. This was a customary practice because the royalties meant big money in some cases.

Music Services, an administrator for music publishers, identifies the song as "Public Domain", while the performing rights organizations American Society of Composers, Authors and Publishers (ASCAP) and Broadcast Music, Inc. (BMI) list songwriters and composers of over 10 works titled "Salty Dog Blues".

== History ==
In his Library of Congress interviews, Jelly Roll Morton recalled a three-piece string band led by Bill Johnson playing the number to great acclaim. Interviewed in the documentary Earl Scruggs: His Family and Friends, Zeke Morris, of the Morris Brothers, claimed to have written the song, although the song had been recorded before the Morris Brothers began performing as a group.

Curly Seckler, who played with Flatt and Scruggs and with Charlie Monroe, was interviewed by Frank Stasio on the December 26, 2008 edition of The State of Things. Seckler was asked about the origin of the name "Salty Dog" and replied that he had been told that it was the name of a locally produced soft drink.

== Lyrics ==
As with many folk songs, the lyrics can vary substantially. Some of the lyrics were published as early as 1911 by Howard Odum in his article "Folk-Song and Folk-Poetry as Found in the Secular Songs of the Southern Negroes" in The Journal of American Folklore.

One of the older versions runs:

Oh won’t you let me be your salty dog,
I don’t want to be your man at all,
You salty dog, you salty dog.

Oh honey baby, let me be your salty dog,
Salty dog, oh you salty dog.

There's just one thing that worries my mind,
All of these browns and none is mine,
You salty dog, you salty dog.

The scaredest I've been in my life
Was when Uncle Bud nearly saw me kiss his wife,
You salty dog, you salty dog.

Lil' fish big fish swimmin' in the water,
Come on here and give me my quarter,
You salty dog, you salty dog.

Like lookin' for a needle in the sand,
Tryin' to find a gal that ain't got no man,
You salty dog, you salty dog.

God made a woman and he made her funny,
Lips 'round her mouth sweeter than honey,
You salty dog, you salty dog.
