= Cronan Balnae =

Irish saint

Cronan Balnae (died 692) was an Irish saint.

While Cronan Balnae (Cronan of Balla) appears to have been a successor of Mo Chua of Balla (d.637), who founded the monastery of Balla, Nollaig O Muraile appears to identify him with Mo Chua himself.

His death, in 692, is recorded in the Annals of the Four Masters.
