= John Francis Cronin =

American Roman Catholic priest (1908–1994)

John Francis Cronin SS (October 4, 1908 – January 2, 1994) was a Catholic priest of the Society of Saint Sulpice, who was an early advisor on anticommunism to freshman U.S. Representative Richard M. Nixon.

== Early life ==
He was born October 4, 1908, in Glens Falls, New York. He graduated at the age of fourteen from St. Mary's Academy. An essay that discussed the dangers faced by coal miners was published in the Glens Falls Post Star. He attended the College of the Holy Cross in Worcester, Massachusetts, and seminary at the Sulpician seminary of the Catholic University of America, where he earned bachelor's degrees in philosophy and sacred theology, and a master's degree in philosophy. In 1932, Cronin was ordained at the Cathedral of the Immaculate Conception in Albany, New York by Bishop Edmund F. Gibbons. He joined the Sulpicians, and in 1935, was awarded a doctorate in philosophy by Catholic University.

== Career ==
=== Teacher ===
Cronin taught economics at St. Mary's Seminary and University in Baltimore, Maryland. While there, he published a pamphlet, A Living Wage Today, that built on Pope Pius XI's encyclical, Quadragesimo Anno, and declared, "The wage paid to the workingman must be sufficient for the support of himself and of his family." In 1938, Archbishop Michael J. Curley of Baltimore asked Father Cronin to establish a School of Social Action to instruct Catholic clergy in the church's teachings on labor, which was later expanded to parishes. According to John T. Donovan, Cronin's writing and teaching helped to sharpen his skills in the area of labor and economics.

He was also assistant director of the Department of Social Action for the National Catholic Welfare Conference.

=== Anticommunist ===
Around the end of the Second World War, Cronin wrote a report for the bishops on the Communist Party of the United States. He had the assistance of FBI officials, who unofficially provided some of the background material for him. When Richard Nixon was elected to Congress in 1946, he sought out information on Communism, and he was introduced to Cronin by Representative Charles J. Kersten (R.WI).

By early February 1947, U.S. Representative Charles J. Kersten had taken the newly elected Richard M. Nixon on several trips to Baltimore to meet with Cronin. At that time, Cronin shared with Nixon his 1945 privately circulated paper "The Problem of American Communism in 1945", with much information from the FBI's William C. Sullivan (who by 1961 would head domestic intelligence under Hoover). By May 1948, Nixon had co-sponsored a "Mundt-Nixon Bill" to implement "a new approach to the complicated problem of internal communist subversion... It provided for registration of all Communist Party members and required a statement of the source of all printed and broadcast material issued by organizations that were found to be Communist fronts." On May 19, 1948, the bill passed the House by 319 to 58 but failed to pass the Senate. (The Nixon Library cites this bill's passage as Nixon's first significant victory in Congress.) During August 1948, Nixon pushed for further investigation of Alger Hiss based on allegations made early that month before the HUAC by Whittaker Chambers: his persistence helped pave the way for the subsequent Hiss Case with two trials in 1949 and a verdict against Hiss in January 1950.

In his paper "The Problem of American Communism In 1945", Cronin wrote, "In the State Department, the most influential Communist has been Alger Hiss." When Whittaker Chambers testified before the House Committee on Un-American Activities in August 1948 and said that Hiss was a Communist, Nixon had already known about the charge from his conversations with Cronin. After Nixon was elected Vice President, he asked Cronin for help in writing speeches, who became an unpaid assistant to Nixon; Cronin wrote the first draft of Nixon's 1956 acceptance speech at the Republican Convention in San Francisco.

He authored the book Communism: A World Menace. However, despite his strong opposition to Communism, Cronin criticized Joseph McCarthy and similar anticommunists in the United States, whom he accused of fostering national disunity.

=== Civil rights activist ===
In the 1950s and 1960s, he strongly supported the civil rights in America. He wrote two of the bishops' statements on race relations and lobbied them to see that they accepted the drafts.

== Works ==
- Economics and Society (1941)
- "The Problem of American Communism in 1945: Facts and Recommendations" (1945)
- Communism: threat to freedom. (New York: Paulist Press, 1962)
- Communism: threat to freedom. (Washington: National Catholic Welfare Conference, 1962)
- Social Principles and Economic Life (1966)

== Awards ==
In 1947, Cronin was awarded an honorary doctorate by the College of the Holy Cross.

== See also ==
- Alger Hiss
- John A. Ryan
- Charles Coughlin
- Anti-Communism
- Society of Saint-Sulpice

== External sources ==
- Brugger, Robert J. (1988). Maryland: A Middle Temperament, 1634-1980. Baltimore: Johns Hopkins University Press. ISBN 9780801833991.
- Callcott, George H (1985). Maryland & America, 1940-1980. Baltimore: Johns Hopkins University Press. ISBN 9780801824920.
- Donovan, John T. (2005). Crusader in the Cold War: A Biography of Fr. John F. Cronin, S.S. (1908-1994). New York: Peter Lang. ISBN 0820474134.
- O'Brien, Thomas W. (1994). "The Nixon-Cronin Speeches: A Cold War Theology". Toronto Journal of Theology. 10 (1): 53–79. doi:10.3138/tjt.10.1.53. ISSN 0826-9831.
- Rosswurm, Steve (2010). The FBI and the Catholic Church, 1935-1962. Amherst: University of Massachusetts Press. ISBN 9781558497290.
- Saxon, Wolfgang (January 5, 1994). "John F. Cronin, 85, Priest and an Expert on Race Relations". The New York Times. New York, N.Y. p. D21.
