= Jim Cronin (zookeeper) =

American zookeeper

Jim Cronin MBE
- Born: James Michael Cronin; 15 November 1951; Yonkers, New York, U.S.
- Died: 17 March 2007 (aged 55); New York City, U.S.
- Occupation: Zookeeper
- Years active: 1987–2007
- Known for: Monkey World
- Spouse(s): Ros Cronin (?-1980s) (divorced); Alison Cronin (m. 1996)
- Children: 1

James Michael Cronin MBE (15 November 1951 – 17 March 2007) was the American co-founder in 1987 of Monkey World in Dorset, England, a sanctuary for abused and neglected primates. He was widely acknowledged as an international expert in the rescue and rehabilitation of abused primates, and in the enforcement of international treaties aimed at protecting them from illegal trade and experimentation.

Cronin was awarded an honorary MBE by Queen Elizabeth II in 2006 for services to animal welfare.

== Early life ==
Cronin was born on 15 November 1951 in Yonkers, New York, to Italian-Irish parents. The son of a union official, he was educated at St Denis School and Lincoln High School. He had a number of jobs after leaving school before becoming a keeper at Bronx Zoo in the 1970s. While working there he realised he wanted to work with animals. In 1980 he moved to Kent in the UK to work in John Aspinall's zoo.

== Working with primates ==
Cronin started his work with primates through working as a zoo keeper in various zoos. In 1980 he came to Britain where he acquired a job as a zoo keeper at John Aspinall's zoo at Howletts, where he perfected his skills of primate rehabilitation and care. John Aspinall had set up a breeding programme for gorillas which were an endangered species. Cronin's passion for working with primates made him quite successful in his career and encouraged him to have an ambition of one day building a safe haven for mistreated primates. During his years working at John Aspinall's Zoo, he gave himself the necessary experience of dealing with apes on a daily basis in his career path of working with them as well as small monkeys and their complex life necessities.

== Monkey World ==
It was during Cronin's years working as a zookeeper at the Howletts Zoo that he was notified about the situation of chimpanzees being abused. These African great apes were being smuggled from the wild by illegal poachers and being transported abroad to Europe, where the young chimpanzees were being purchased, and used as props by photographers on beach resorts in Spain. These chimps would suffer severe abuse – having their teeth knocked out to prevent them biting tourists, drugged to remain sedate, and physically beaten to remain submissive and easy to handle before growing too big and being killed to be replaced by another. Cronin was infuriated by the fate that these apes encountered and decided to dedicate his life in trying to solve the problem.

In the mid-1980s, Spain had released legislation that forbade the use of chimpanzees as photographer's props, and this turn of action gave Cronin some optimism on how he would reach his goal of helping the chimps. In 1986, Cronin approached a British couple called Simon and Peggy Templer who had started rescuing the beach chimps in 1978. Cronin worked together with the Templers who had set up a half-way house where the confiscated chimps were being housed. The chimps would not be able to stay there for long, and it was Cronin's idea that shed light. Cronin requested discussions on how he could possibly help and with the assistance of the Spanish authorities (the Guardia Civil) confiscating the chimps, there would certainly be more individuals arriving at the small half-way house.

During 1987, Cronin returned to England and focused on how he could possibly build a sanctuary for the chimps. The Templers agreed to re-home the chimps at the sanctuary which Cronin promised to be able to build. Cronin recruited help from his best friend Jeremy Keeling, who was a fellow zookeeper, and the pair set out to achieve their ambition of a primate sanctuary. Cronin was notified about an abandoned pig farm located near Wool, Dorset. The old land covered 65 acres and would be perfect for what would become a primate rescue centre.

After securing a small business loan, Cronin acquired permission to build the first enclosure which would be for the chimps. He knew that the animals needed to know how to live a natural way of life again, therefore Cronin set up a map of the enclosure which would cover two acres, filled with grass, shrubs and custom-built climbing structures made from telephone poles. The whole two acres would be surrounded by an electric fence. After some finishing touches, such as a café and a children's playground, the sanctuary was finally complete and was named Monkey World Ape Rescue Centre.

In July 1987, Cronin was able to bring the first group of nine chimps from the Templers' half-way house to Monkey World. Once at the park, the chimpanzees were rehabilitated and housed in their new accommodations. Also within the park was one hand-reared female Bornean orangutan named Amy, who was brought by Jeremy Keeling, whose job it was to look after the animals at the centre. There was the arrival of some Barbary macaques, pig-tailed macaques and some ring-tailed lemurs, which made up the rest of the collection of primates housed in Cronin's rescue centre. More chimpanzees from Spain arrived at the park.

Cronin opened Monkey World on 7 August 1987, providing the public with a rare opportunity to observe exotic primates. He made the sanctuary a rescue centre and not a zoo. The female chimpanzees were put on birth control to save space for more individuals needing rescuing. Monkey World did not only rescue Spanish beach chimps, but chimps from a variety of circumstances such as exotic pets, circus entertainers and medical research laboratory subjects. In 1993, Cronin met Alison Ames, an authority on animal behaviour and Cambridge graduate in biological anthropology. She and Cronin were married in 1996, from then on running Monkey World as a combined venture.

Cronin could hardly believe that his small refuge centre had grown into a thriving rescue centre for primates from around the world. Monkey World worked with the Ping Tung Rescue Centre in Taiwan in stopping the illegal smuggling of apes from the wild, and Monkey World was able to re-home some of the primates from the Ping Tung Rescue Centre, including Bornean orangutans and different species of gibbon. Monkey World started working with foreign governments in the prevention of primate smuggling for pet trades, including the exotic pet trade in Britain which allowed citizens to keep primates as pets without being able to care for them properly or meet their substantial needs. Cronin and Alison travelled to places around the world, investigating animal trades, especially the trade and exploitation of primates.

Cronin's sanctuary had successfully recruited a number of Primate Care Staff who see that the day-to-day requirements of the primates are met. Veterinary consultants were brought in to help treat the animals and Adoption Schemes were set up to allow the park to continue its rescue and rehabilitation work. The biggest rescue the centre undertook was that of the 19 retired stump-tailed macaques from a medical research laboratory in the UK; but the rescue mission in 2008, of the 88 capuchin monkeys from a medical research laboratory in Chile, took the record of the largest rescue of primates in the world.

In 2006, Cronin was awarded an MBE by Queen Elizabeth II for services to animal welfare: he was accompanied by Robert Pitts. Cronin has also received the Jane Goodall Award.

The television series Monkey Business (made by Meridian Broadcasting and shown on ITV Meridian in the UK and on Animal Planet worldwide) has documented the Cronin's frequent rescue missions and undercover investigations throughout Europe and Asia for the past 10 years. Beginning in 2007, Monkey Business was replaced with Monkey Life, which also documents the goings-on within Monkey World.

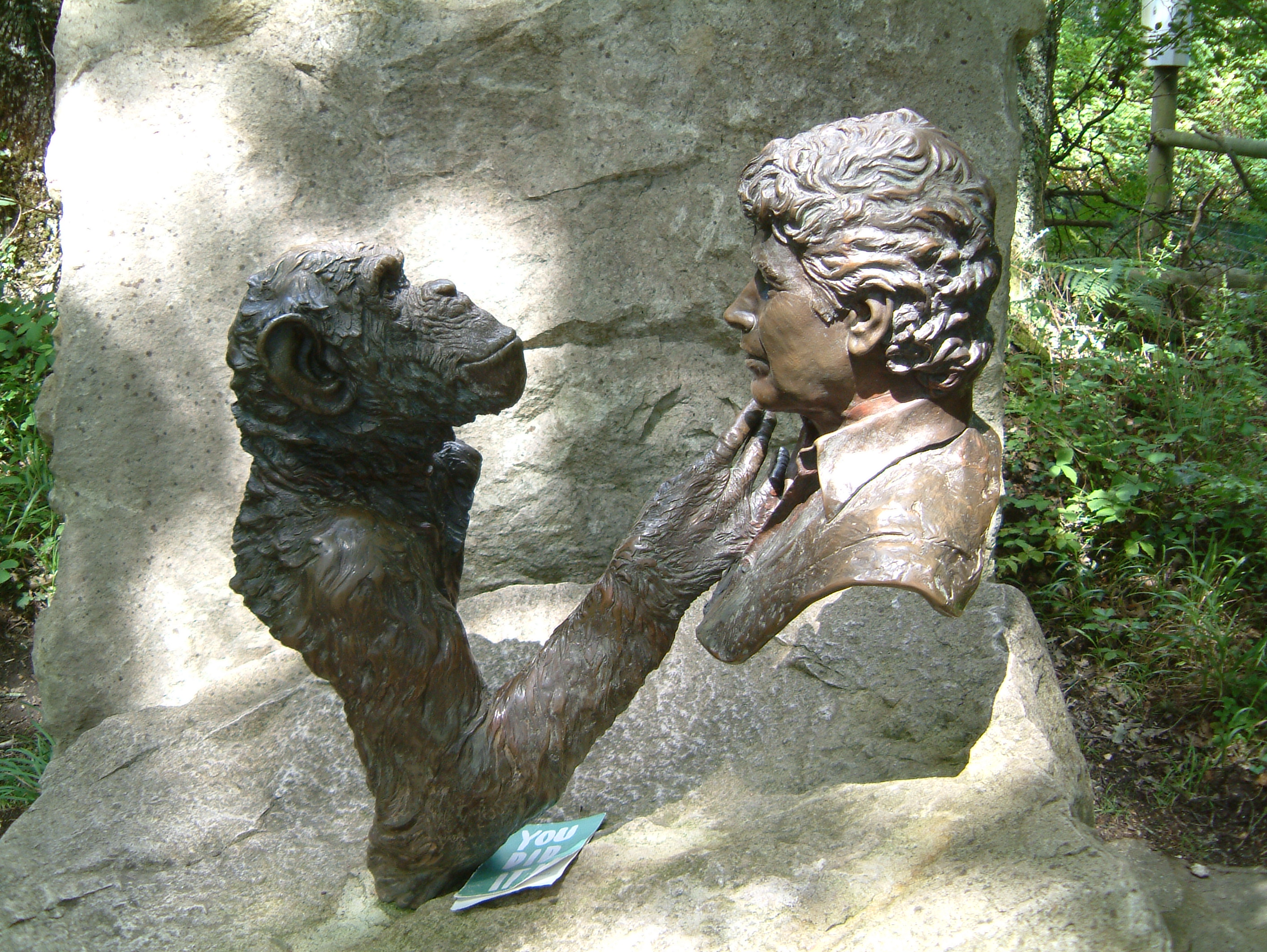
Jim Cronin and Charlie – Jim Cronin Memorial, Monkey World

== Death ==
Following a brief battle with liver cancer, Cronin died on 17 March 2007 at the Cabrini Medical Center, Manhattan, New York. He was survived by his daughter Eleanor, from his first marriage, and his wife Alison Cronin. Since his death, Monkey World has been run by Alison.

=== Jim Cronin Memorial Fund ===
The Jim Cronin Memorial Fund for Primate Welfare and Conservation was set up for the purpose of continuing Cronin's legacy and for the support of primate conservation and welfare all over the world. It is a UK-registered charity, number 1126939, and is sponsored by Monkey World.
