= Pete Thomas (saxophonist) =

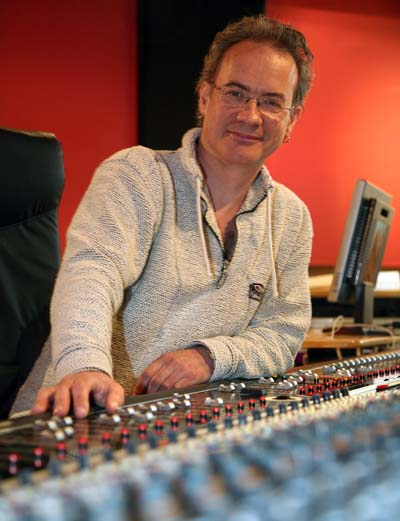

Background information
- Born: Peter James Thomas; London, England
- Genres: Rhythm & Blues, Rock, Pop
- Occupations: Musician and composer
- Instrument: Saxophone
- Labels: Mermaid Records, UPPM Records (Universal)

Pete Thomas is a British music producer, TV and film composer, recording musician, and saxophonist. He was born in London and is based in Southampton, England.

== Career ==

Thomas studied saxophone at Leeds College of Music, obtaining a first class diploma. He has worked as head of jazz and pop performance at University of Southampton, where he also taught saxophone and composition. He had one of his first professional gigs with Fats Domino. This led to working with Joe Jackson on his Jumpin' Jive album and world tours, as saxophonist and co-arranger. He composed music for Blue Ice featuring Michael Caine, Monkey Business for Meridian TV and American Kickboxer II. His work has also been featured in the video game Fallout New Vegas. He has also worked with Bill Haley & His Comets, Elton John, PJ Harvey, The Proclaimers, R.E.M., Cliff Richard, Dave Stewart, Richard Thompson, Kim Wilde, and Jimmy Witherspoon.

== Discography ==
Title	Label	Year	Notes
Mr. Lucky	Mermaid	2007	Audio/video CD
Midnight in the Naked City	Mermaid	2011	CD album
Big	Mermaid	2013	CD album
Mad, Bad & Remixed	UPPM (Universal)	2014	Collaboration with various DJs
Boppin' with Lee	Mermaid	2020	Single - Feat. Lee Allen (musician)
