= Cronan of Tuamgraney =

Saint Cronan was a 6th-century Irish saint, and founder of monasteries.

Cronan is the founder of Inchicronan Priory and patron saint of the towns of Tuamgraney and Roscrea. St. Cronan's Church, Tuamgraney is one claimant for the oldest continuously used building in Ireland.
