= Monkey World =

Coordinates: 50.697311°N 2.217725°W

- Interactive map of Monkey World
- Date opened: 7 August 1987
- Location: Dorset, England
- Land area: 65 acres (26.3 ha)
- No. of animals: Over 250
- No. of species: 20
- Website: monkeyworld.org

The Monkey World Ape Rescue Centre is a 65-acre (26.3 ha) ape and monkey sanctuary, rescue centre and primatarium near Wool, Dorset, England.

== History ==
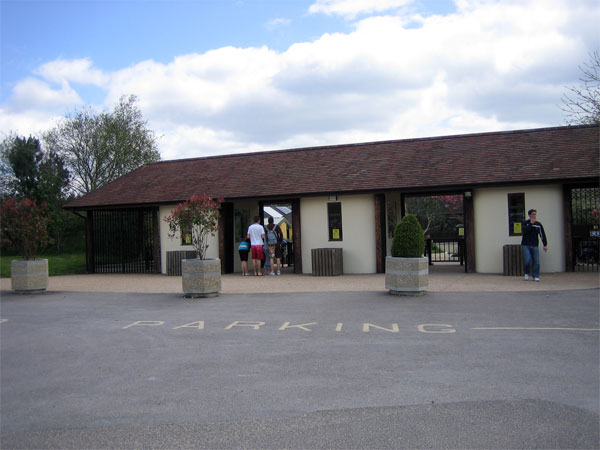
Entrance, photographed in May 2006

Set up in 1987 by Jim Cronin with assistance from both Jeremy Keeling and later operated by both Cronin and his wife Alison along with a team of care staff led by Keeling, Monkey World was originally intended to provide a home for abused chimpanzees used as props by Spanish beach photographers, but is now home to many different species of primates.

Monkey World's first resident was a female Bornean orangutan named Amy, who had been hand-reared by Keeling. Amy was later paired with a male orangutan named Banghi, who was given to Monkey World on loan from Chester Zoo. In 1997, Amy and Banghi had a son together named Gordon before Banghi died in 1998. On 13 July 1987, Monkey World's first chimpanzees Paddy (d. 2016), Busta, Jimmy (d. 2021), Micky, Sammy (d.2022), Taffy (d. 1989), Beth, Cindy and Zoe (d.2021) arrived at the park. In April 1998, Monkey World rescued a young female chimpanzee named Trudy, who had been filmed being beaten by Mary Chipperfield. Chipperfield was later charged with 12 counts of animal cruelty.

=== Selected primate species ===
Primates

- Capuchin monkey
- Common marmoset
- White-headed marmoset
- Cotton-top tamarin
- Patas monkey
- White-throated guenon
- Ring-tailed lemur
- White-faced saki
- Slow loris
- Spider monkey
- Squirrel monkey
- Stump-tailed macaque
- Woolly monkey
- Common chimpanzee
- Bornean orangutan
- Sumatran orangutan
- Agile gibbon
- Lar gibbon
- Müller's gibbon
- Siamang
- Yellow-cheeked gibbon

On Saturday 17 March 2007 Jim Cronin died in a New York hospital aged 55 years from liver cancer. His widow Alison Cronin and the staff at Monkey World have continued to run the centre.

Monkey World works with foreign governments to stop the illegal smuggling of wild primates. In January 2008 the group performed what The Guardian called "the world's biggest rescue mission of its kind," when it saved 88 capuchin monkeys from a laboratory in Santiago, Chile, where some of the animals had been kept in solitary cages for up to twenty years. The operation was carried out at the request of the laboratory, and with help from the Chilean Air Force, who flew the animals to Bournemouth airport with special permission from the British government.

In August 2010 Monkey World rescued a Bornean orangutan called Oshine from Johannesburg, South Africa. On 7 December 2010 Monkey World rescued an orphan baby Sumatran orangutan called Silvestre from a zoo in Spain. In January 2011, Monkey World rescued a chimpanzee named Kiki from Lebanon.

In September 2018, Monkey World rescued a female chimpanzee named Toprish (d. 2023), who had been stolen from the wild for the illegal pet trade before being left at a zoo in Turkey. In October that same year, Monkey World rescued another female chimpanzee named Naree, whom Alison Cronin first encountered with Jim in 2003.

In February 2020, Monkey World rescued a 37-year-old chimpanzee named Kalu, who had been kept as a pet on a stud farm in South Africa until her owner's death.

During Storm Eunice in February 2022, a very rare woolly monkey was unexpectedly born, only to be followed by another in March. The park also suffered during the storm, with lots of trees being felled and fences being damaged.

== Overview ==
Monkey World features the largest group of chimpanzees outside Africa which are housed in four different social groups. Many of its animals are rescued from the black market pet trade, laboratories and from abuse as tourist photographer props. The park also features three groups of orangutans, including two different species (Bornean and Sumatran). It is host to Europe's only orangutan crèche which raises all orphaned or abandoned orangutans in Europe. Whilst open to housing gorillas, the park has not yet come across any which require rescue or rehabilitation at the park. Additionally, the park houses five different species of gibbon (agile gibbon, lar gibbon, Müller's gibbon, siamang and golden-cheeked gibbon) and 14 species of monkey/prosimian (capuchins, common marmosets, Geoffrey's marmosets, cotton-top tamarins, patas monkeys, red-bellied guenons, ring-tailed lemurs, white-faced saki, slow loris, spider monkeys, squirrel monkeys, stump-tailed macaques and woolly monkeys).

== Dao Tien Rescue Centre ==
In 2008, Monkey World along with the Pingtung Rescue Centre, Cat Tien National Park and the Forestry Protection Department worked together to create the Dao Tien Rescue centre in South Vietnam to save gibbons and other primates from the pet trade, smuggling, theme parks and restaurants. Since opening, Dao Tien has confiscated and/or rescued over 50 endangered primates including golden-cheeked gibbons, pygmy slow loris, black-shanked douc, grey-shanked douc, southern white-cheeked gibbon, northern buffed-cheeked gibbon, white-faced saki and silvered langur. 27 of these primates have been rehabilitated and released into native habitats. After release they are tracked using radio collars. Dao Tien is run by the charity Endangered Asian Species Trust (EAST), who rescue and rehabilitate endangered Vietnamese primates. The work of Dr. Marina Kenyon and her team has been documented in the Monkey Life TV series since Series 2.:)

== Television appearances ==
The TV documentary Monkey Business ran for 9 seasons between 1998 and 2006. Its successor Monkey Life, began in 2008 and 18 seasons have been shown as of 2026.

Other television appearances include:

- Monkey Life – Season 4 on National Geographic Channel
  - Seasons 1, 2 & 3 on Animal Planet; currently showing on Animal Planet (Europe)
- Monkey Business on ITV and Animal Planet. A concluded series produced by Meridian Television focusing on Monkey World. Nine series have been broadcast to date, with two specials on "Jim Cronin's Legacy" broadcast in June 2008. Monkey Business has been succeeded by Monkey Life, produced by Primate Planet Productions Ltd.
- Challenge Anneka on BBC
- Nature Watch on ITV
- Operation Chimpanzee on BBC
- State of the Ark on BBC
- Animal Hospital on BBC
- CNN & Sky TV, highlighting a rescue operation in Turkey of smuggled chimpanzees
- ITV GMTV, covering the illegal pet trade in Turkey. Since 1998 Monkey World has been working in cooperation with the Turkish Government to stop the smuggling of chimpanzees from the wild for the entertainment and pet trade.
- QED Saving Trudy on BBC
- Animals in Love Episode 1 on BBC, discussing siamang gibbon Sam's depression of losing his mate Sage and son Onion before recovering after being given a new mate named Sasak.
- Inside Out London on BBC, discussing if keeping exotic pets should be banned.

Russell Brand often used to talk about Monkey World on his old BBC Radio 2 programme and podcast.

== Awards ==
Monkey World has won a number of awards, including:

- Tripadvisor Certificate of Excellence, 2014, 2012 and 2011
- Highly Commended Bournemouth Tourism Awards, 2012
- The Independent 50 Best Spring Days out in Britain, 2004
- The Good Britain Guide, Family Attraction of the Year for Dorset, 2000

Jim Cronin and Alison Cronin jointly received the Jane Goodall Award for their work with Monkey World.

== See also ==
- List of animal sanctuaries
