= Alison Cronin =

American primatologist

Alison Cronin MBE
- Born: Alison Lorraine Ames; September 1966 (age 59); United States
- Occupations: Zookeeper, primate behavioural expert
- Known for: Monkey World
- Spouse: Jim Cronin (m. 1996; died 2007)

Alison Lorraine Cronin (nee Ames), MBE (born September 1966) is the American director of Monkey World in Dorset, England, a sanctuary for abused and neglected primates. She is an expert in the rescue and rehabilitation of abused primates, and in the enforcement of international treaties aimed at protecting them from illegal trade and experimentation.

Cronin was appointed a Member of the Order of the British Empire (MBE) in 2006 for Services to Animal Welfare along with her husband as well as for founding the Endangered Asian Species Trust.

== Early life and career ==
Cronin was born in September 1966 as Alison Lorraine Ames in San Diego, California. She studied physical anthropology at Cambridge University. It was while she was living in the UK that she met Jim Cronin at Monkey World in 1993. They married in 1996. They were joint directors of Monkey World. After her husband died, Cronin continued running the site and working against animal smuggling and the pet trade.

Cronin became known through the television series Monkey Business (made by Meridian Broadcasting and shown on ITV Meridian in the UK and on Animal Planet worldwide) which has documented the frequent rescue missions and undercover investigations throughout Europe and Asia. The show began in 1998 with Monkey Business which was then replaced with Monkey Life in 2007. It covers the low and high-profile rescues, one of the most dramatic being in January 2008 when Cronin led a huge rescue of 88 Capuchin monkeys from Chile.

In 2008, Cronin led the creation of the Dao Tien Endangered Primate Rescue Centre located in Cát Tiên National Park, Southern Vietnam which is a rescue, rehabilitation, and release centre focusing on golden-cheeked gibbons, black-shanked douc langurs, silvered langurs, and pygmy loris. Cronin has written on primates as well as fought to get legislation changed to protect the primates.

In 2018, Cronin was awarded an honorary degree from Oxford Brookes University for her work.
