= List of hominoids =

Species in mammal superfamily Hominoidea

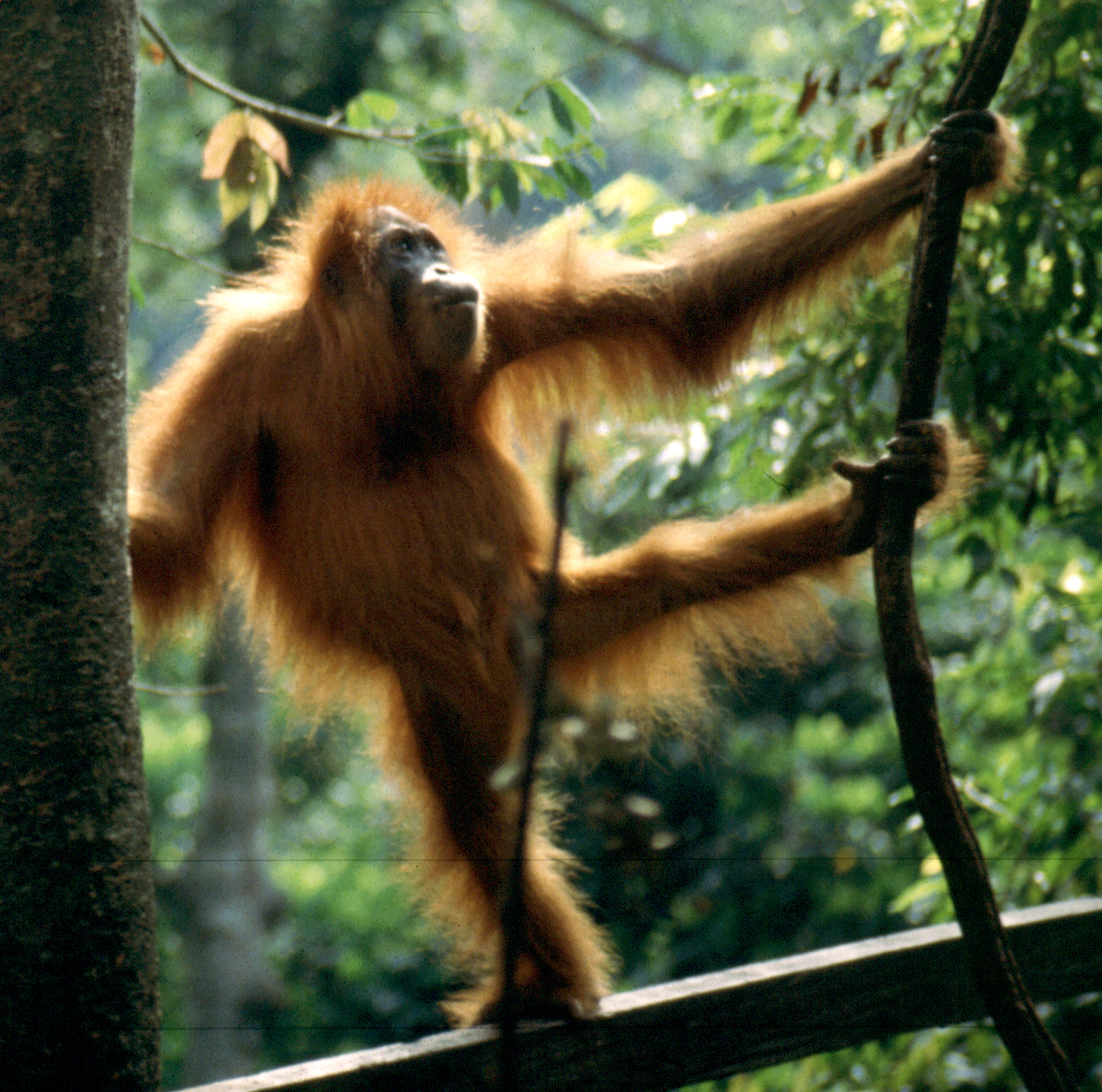
Sumatran orangutan (Pongo abelli)

Hominoidea is a superfamily of primates. Members of this superfamily are called hominoids or apes, and include gorillas, chimpanzees, orangutans, gibbons, bonobos, and humans. Hominoidea is one of the six major groups in the order Primates. The majority are found in forests in Southeastern Asia and Equatorial Africa, with the exception of humans, which have spread worldwide to every biome. They range in size from some gibbon species in the genus Nomascus, at 40 cm (16 in), to the eastern gorilla, at 196 cm (77 in), not including limbs. Hominoids primarily eat fruit, leaves, flowers, and insects, though humans are omnivorous. Most hominoids do not have population estimates, but the ones that do range from 10 mature individuals to 47,000, in addition to over 8 billion humans. Nearly every species is categorized as endangered or critically endangered; aside from humans, the only exception is the eastern hoolock gibbon, classified as vulnerable.

The twenty-eight extant species of Hominoidea are divided into two families: Hominidae, containing five gorilla, chimpanzee, and human species divided into three genera in the subfamily Homininae, and three orangutan species in a single genus in the subfamily Ponginae; and Hylobatidae, containing twenty gibbon species divided into four genera. Dozens of extinct prehistoric hominoid species have been discovered, though due to ongoing research and discoveries the exact number and categorization is not fixed.

== Conventions ==
IUCN Red List categories
Conservation status
- EX: Extinct (0 species)
- EW: Extinct in the wild (0 species)
- CR: Critically endangered (10 species)
- EN: Endangered (16 species)
- VU: Vulnerable (1 species)
- NT: Near threatened (0 species)
- LC: Least concern (0 species)

Other categories
- DD: Data deficient (0 species)
- NE: Not evaluated (1 species)

The author citation for the species or genus is given after the scientific name; parentheses around the author citation indicate that this was not the original taxonomic placement. Conservation status codes listed follow the International Union for Conservation of Nature (IUCN) Red List of Threatened Species. Range maps are provided wherever possible; if a range map is not available, a description of the hominoid's range is provided. Ranges are based on the IUCN Red List for that species unless otherwise noted. All extinct genera, species, or subspecies listed alongside extant species went extinct after 1500 CE, and are indicated by a dagger symbol "†".

== Classification ==
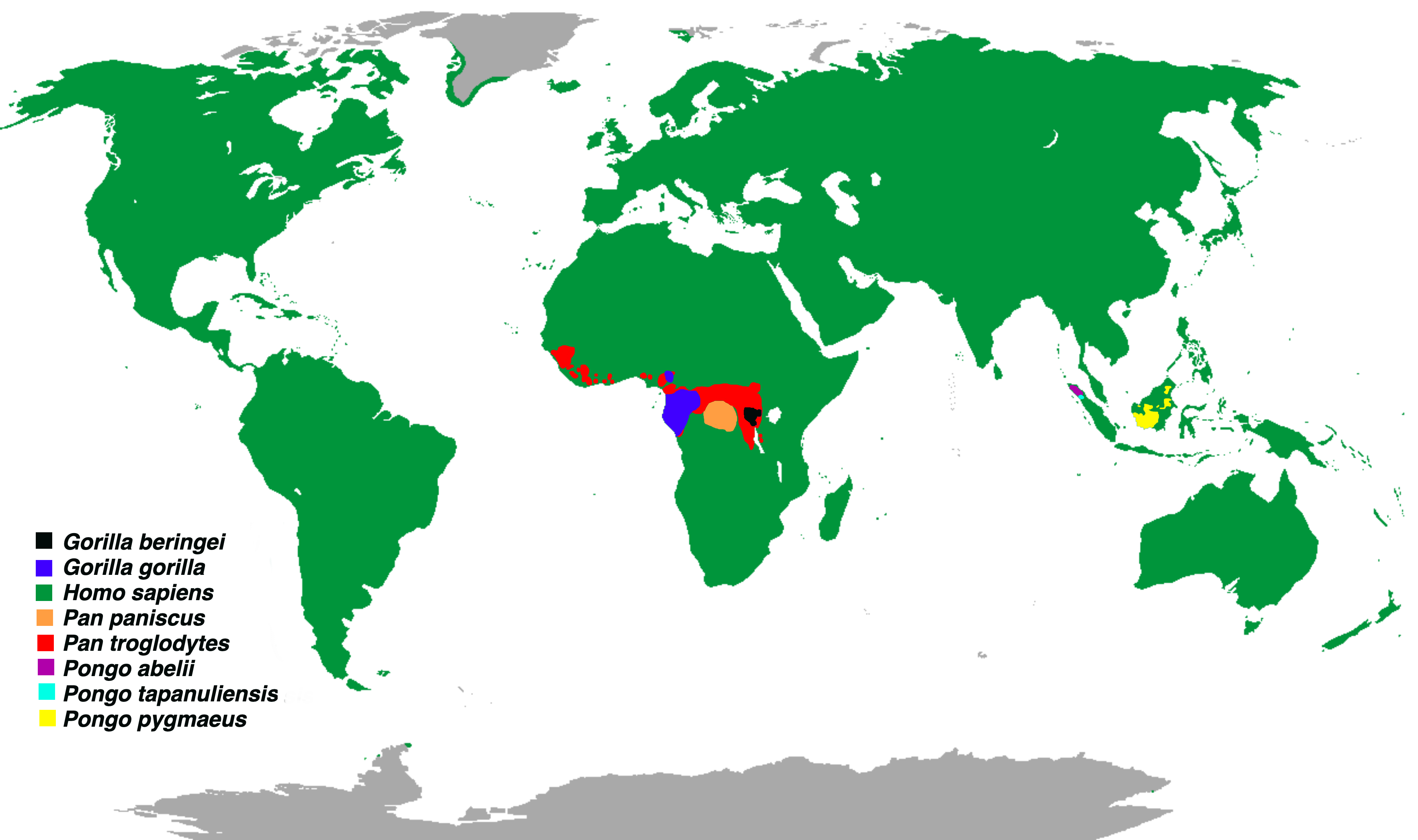
Distribution of hominid species

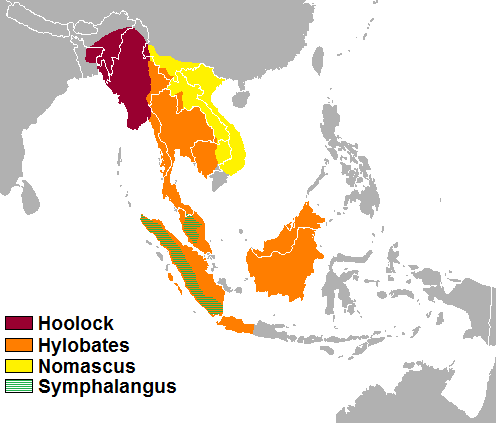
Distribution of hylobatid species

The superfamily Hominoidea consists of two extant families: Hominidae and Hylobatidae. Hominidae is divided into two subfamilies: Homininae, containing five species divided between three genera, and Ponginae, containing three species in a single genus. Hylobatidae contains twenty species in four genera.

Family Hominidae

- Subfamily Homininae
  - Genus Gorilla (gorillas): two species
  - Genus Homo (human): one species
  - Genus Pan (chimpanzees): two species
- Subfamily Ponginae
  - Genus Pongo (orangutans): three species

Family Hylobatidae

- Genus Hoolock (hoolock gibbons): three species
- Genus Hylobates (dwarf gibbons): nine species
- Genus Nomascus (crested gibbons): seven species
- Genus Symphalangus (siamang): one species

- Hominoidea
  - Hominidae
    - Ponginae
      Pongo
    - Homininae
      - Gorilla
      - - Pan
        - Homo
  - Hylobatidae
    - - Hylobates
      - - Nomascus
        - - Hoolock
          - Symphalangus

== Hominoids ==
The following classification is based on the taxonomy described by the reference work Mammal Species of the World (2005), with augmentation by generally accepted proposals made since using molecular phylogenetic analysis, as supported by both the IUCN and the American Society of Mammalogists.

=== Family Hominidae ===
==== Subfamily Homininae ====
Genus Gorilla – Geoffroy, 1852 – two species
Common name	Scientific name and subspecies	Range	Size and ecology	IUCN status and estimated population
Eastern gorilla	G. beringei Matschie, 1903 Two subspecies: G. b. beringei (Mountain gorilla); G. b. graueri (Eastern lowland gorilla)	Central Africa	Size: 160–196 cm (63–77 in) long Habitat: Forest Diet: Roots, leaves, stems, and pith, as well as bark, wood, flowers, fruit, fungi, galls, invertebrates, and gorilla dung	CR 2,600
Western gorilla	G. gorilla (Savage, 1847) Two subspecies: G. g. diehli (Cross River gorilla); G. g. gorilla (Western lowland gorilla)	Western Africa	Size: 130–185 cm (51–73 in) long Habitat: Forest Diet: Leaves, berries, ferns, and fibrous bark	CR Unknown

Genus Homo – Linnaeus, 1758 – one species
Common name	Scientific name and subspecies	Range	Size and ecology	IUCN status and estimated population
Human	H. sapiens Linnaeus, 1758	Worldwide (population density shown)	Size: 140–210 cm (55–83 in) long, including legs Habitat: Varied Diet: Omnivorous	NE 8 billion

Genus Pan – Oken, 1816 – two species
Common name	Scientific name and subspecies	Range	Size and ecology	IUCN status and estimated population
Bonobo	P. paniscus Schwarz, 1929	Central Africa	Size: 70–83 cm (28–33 in) long Habitat: Forest Diet: Fruits and seeds, as well as leaves, stems, shoots, pith, bark, flowers, truffles, fungus, and honey	EN Unknown
Chimpanzee	P. troglodytes (Blumenbach, 1775) Four subspecies: P. t. ellioti (Nigeria-Cameroon chimpanzee); P. t. schweinfurthii (Eastern chimpanzee); P. t. troglodytes (Central chimpanzee); P. t. verus (Western chimpanzee)	Central and western Africa	Size: 63–90 cm (25–35 in) long Habitat: Forest and savanna Diet: Fruit, leaves, stems, buds, bark, pith, seeds, and resins, as well as insects, small vertebrates, and eggs	EN Unknown

==== Subfamily Ponginae ====
Genus Pongo – Lacépède, 1799 – three species
Common name	Scientific name and subspecies	Range	Size and ecology	IUCN status and estimated population
Bornean orangutan	P. pygmaeus (Linnaeus, 1760) Three subspecies: P. p. morio (Northeast Bornean orangutan); P. p. pygmaeus (Northwest Bornean orangutan); P. p. wurmbii (Central Bornean orangutan)	Borneo	Size: 78–97 cm (31–38 in) long Habitat: Forest Diet: Fruit, leaves, shoots, as well as insects, sap, vines, spider webs, bird eggs, fungi, flowers, bark, and soil	CR Unknown
Sumatran orangutan	P. abelii Lesson, 1827	Northern island of Sumatra in Indonesia	Size: 78–97 cm (31–38 in) long Habitat: Forest Diet: Fruit, leaves, flowers, and bark, as well as insects and eggs	CR Unknown
Tapanuli orangutan	P. tapanuliensis Nurcahyo, Meijaard, Nowak, Fredriksson, Groves, 2017	South Tapanuli in Sumatra	Size: 78–97 cm (31–38 in) long Habitat: Forest Diet: Fruit and leaves	CR Unknown

=== Family Hylobatidae ===
Genus Hoolock – Mootnick, Groves, 2005 – three species
Common name	Scientific name and subspecies	Range	Size and ecology	IUCN status and estimated population
Eastern hoolock gibbon	H. leuconedys (Groves, 1967)	Southern Asia	Size: About 55 cm (22 in) long Habitat: Forest Diet: Fruit, as well as leaves and shoots	VU Unknown
Skywalker hoolock gibbon	H. tianxing Fan, 2017	Southern Asia	Size: About 81 cm (32 in) long Habitat: Forest Diet: Fruit and leaves, as well as invertebrates, bird chicks, and flowers	EN Unknown
Western hoolock gibbon	H. hoolock (Harlan, 1834)	Southern Asia	Size: 45–65 cm (18–26 in) long Habitat: Forest Diet: Fruit and leaves	EN Unknown

Genus Hylobates – Illiger, 1811 – nine species
Common name	Scientific name and subspecies	Range	Size and ecology	IUCN status and estimated population
Agile gibbon	H. agilis F. Cuvier, 1821	Southeastern Asia	Size: 45–65 cm (18–26 in) long Habitat: Forest Diet: Fruit, as well as flowers, leaves, and insects	EN Unknown
Bornean white-bearded gibbon	H. albibarbis Lyon, 1911	Southern Borneo	Size: 45–65 cm (18–26 in) long Habitat: Forest Diet: Fruit, as well as leaves, insects, and flowers	EN Unknown
Eastern grey gibbon	H. funereus I. Geoffroy, 1850	Northern Borneo (in yellow)	Size: 47–49 cm (19–19 in) long Habitat: Forest Diet: Fruit, as well as leaves, flowers, and insects	EN Unknown
Kloss's gibbon	H. klossii (Miller, 1903)	Mentawai Islands, west of Sumatra	Size: 44–64 cm (17–25 in) long Habitat: Forest Diet: Fruit, as well as flowers, eggs, small vertebrates, and insects	EN Unknown
Lar gibbon	H. lar (Linnaeus, 1771) Five subspecies: H. l. carpenteri (Carpenter's lar gibbon); H. l. entelloides (Central lar gibbon); H. l. lar (Malaysian lar gibbon); H. l. vestitus (Sumatran lar gibbon); H. l. yunnanensis (Yunnan lar gibbon)	Southeastern Asia	Size: 45–60 cm (18–24 in) long Habitat: Forest Diet: Fruit, as well as leafy plants, flowers, and insects	EN Unknown
Müller's gibbon	H. muelleri Martin, 1841	Southeastern Asia	Size: 44–64 cm (17–25 in) long Habitat: Forest Diet: Fruit, as well as leaves	EN Unknown
Pileated gibbon	H. pileatus (Gray, 1861)	Southeastern Asia	Size: 45–64 cm (18–25 in) long Habitat: Forest Diet: Fruit, as well as leaves, shoots, insects, eggs, and small vertebrates	EN 47,000
Silvery gibbon	H. moloch (Audebert, 1798)	Island of Java in Indonesia	Size: 42–64 cm (17–25 in) long Habitat: Forest Diet: Fruit and leaves, as well as flowers and insects	EN Unknown
Western grey gibbon	H. abbotti Kloss, 1929	Western Borneo	Size: 42–64 cm (17–25 in) long Habitat: Forest Diet: Leaves, fruit, flowers, and insects	EN 30,000–45,000

Genus Nomascus – Miller, 1933 – seven species
Common name	Scientific name and subspecies	Range	Size and ecology	IUCN status and estimated population
Black crested gibbon	N. concolor (Harlan, 1826) Four subspecies: N. c. concolor (Tonkin black crested gibbon); N. c. furvogaster (West Yunnan black crested gibbon); N. c. jingdongensis (Central Yunnan black crested gibbon); N. c. lu (Central Yunnan black crested gibbon)	Southeastern Asia	Size: 43–54 cm (17–21 in) long Habitat: Forest Diet: Leaves and fruit, as well as buds, flowers, insects, eggs, and small vertebrates	CR 1,500
Eastern black crested gibbon	N. nasutus (Künckel d'Herculais, 1884)	Southeastern Asia	Size: 40–60 cm (16–24 in) long Habitat: Forest Diet: Fruit, leaves, and buds, as well as animals, flowers, and plant parts	CR 45
Hainan black crested gibbon	N. hainanus (Thomas, 1892)	Island of Hainan in China	Size: 40–60 cm (16–24 in) long Habitat: Forest Diet: Fruit	CR 10
Northern buffed-cheeked gibbon	N. annamensis Thinh, 2010	Southeastern Asia	Size: 40–60 cm (16–24 in) long Habitat: Forest Diet: Fruit, leaves, shoots, and flowers, as well as small mammals and lizards	EN Unknown
Northern white-cheeked gibbon	N. leucogenys (Ogilby, 1840)	Southeastern Asia	Size: 45–63 cm (18–25 in) long Habitat: Forest Diet: Fruit, as well as leaves, flowers, and insects	CR Unknown
Southern white-cheeked gibbon	N. siki (Delacour, 1951)	Southeastern Asia	Size: 47–64 cm (19–25 in) long Habitat: Forest Diet: Fruit	CR 600
Yellow-cheeked gibbon	N. gabriellae (Thomas, 1909)	Southeastern Asia	Size: 45–50 cm (18–20 in) long Habitat: Forest Diet: Fruit, leaves, and flowers	EN Unknown

Genus Symphalangus – Gloger, 1841 – one species
Common name	Scientific name and subspecies	Range	Size and ecology	IUCN status and estimated population
Siamang	S. syndactylus (Raffles, 1821)	Southeastern Asia	Size: 71–90 cm (28–35 in) long Habitat: Forest Diet: Fruit and leaves, as well as flowers and insects	EN Unknown

== Sources ==
- Ankel-Simons, Friderun (2000). Primate Anatomy: An Introduction. Academic Press. ISBN 978-0-12-058670-7.
- Burnie, David; Wilson, Don E., eds. (2017). Animal: The Definitive Visual Guide. DK. ISBN 978-1-4654-7086-7.
- Francis, Charles (2019). Field Guide to the Mammals of South-east Asia (2nd ed.). Bloomsbury Publishing. ISBN 978-1-4729-3499-4.
- Groves, Colin P. (2005). Wilson, Don E.; Reeder, DeeAnn M. (eds.). Mammal Species of the World. Vol. 1 (3rd ed.). Johns Hopkins University Press. ISBN 978-0-8018-8221-0.
- Kingdon, Jonathan (2015). The Kingdon Field Guide to African Mammals (Second ed.). Bloomsbury Publishing. ISBN 978-1-4729-2531-2.
- Petter, Jean-Jacques; Desbordes, François (2013). Primates of the World: An Illustrated Guide. Princeton University Press. ISBN 978-0-691-15695-8.
- Supriatna, Jatna (2022). Field Guide to the Primates of Indonesia. Springer Nature. ISBN 978-3-03-083206-3.
