= Grey gibbon =

Grey gibbon can refer to three species of gibbon in the genus Hylobates endemic to Borneo, all of which were formerly classified in a single species, H. muelleri:

- Western grey gibbon or Abbott's grey gibbon, Hylobates abbotti
- Eastern grey gibbon or northern grey gibbon, Hylobates funereus
- Southern grey gibbon or Müller's gibbon, Hylobates muelleri
