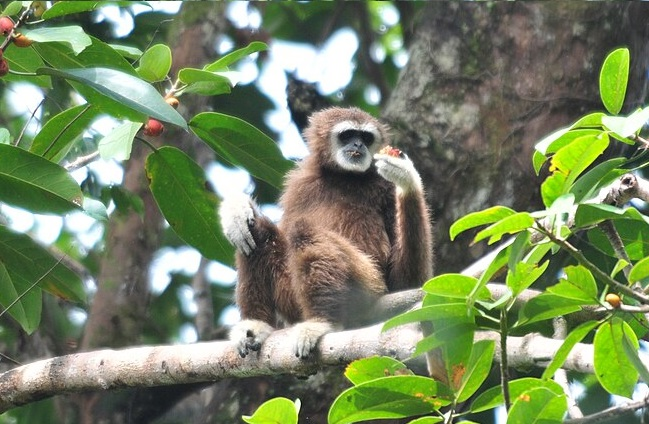

Conservation status
- Endangered (IUCN 3.1)

Scientific classification
- Kingdom: Animalia
- Phylum: Chordata
- Class: Mammalia
- Order: Primates
- Superfamily: Hominoidea
- Family: Hylobatidae
- Genus: Hylobates
- Species: H. lar
- Subspecies: H. l. vestitus

Trinomial name
- Hylobates lar vestitus Miller, 1942
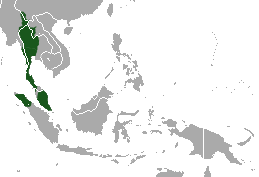
- Lar gibbon range, including northern Sumatra

= Sumatran lar gibbon =

Subspecies of ape

The Sumatran lar gibbon (Hylobates lar vestitus), also known as the Sumatran white-handed gibbon, is a subspecies of the lar gibbon, a primate in the gibbon family Hylobatidae. It is native to the island of Sumatra, Indonesia. It shares the tree tops with orangutans, which, like the gibbon, rarely come out of the trees due to predators, such as tigers and possibly sun bears.
