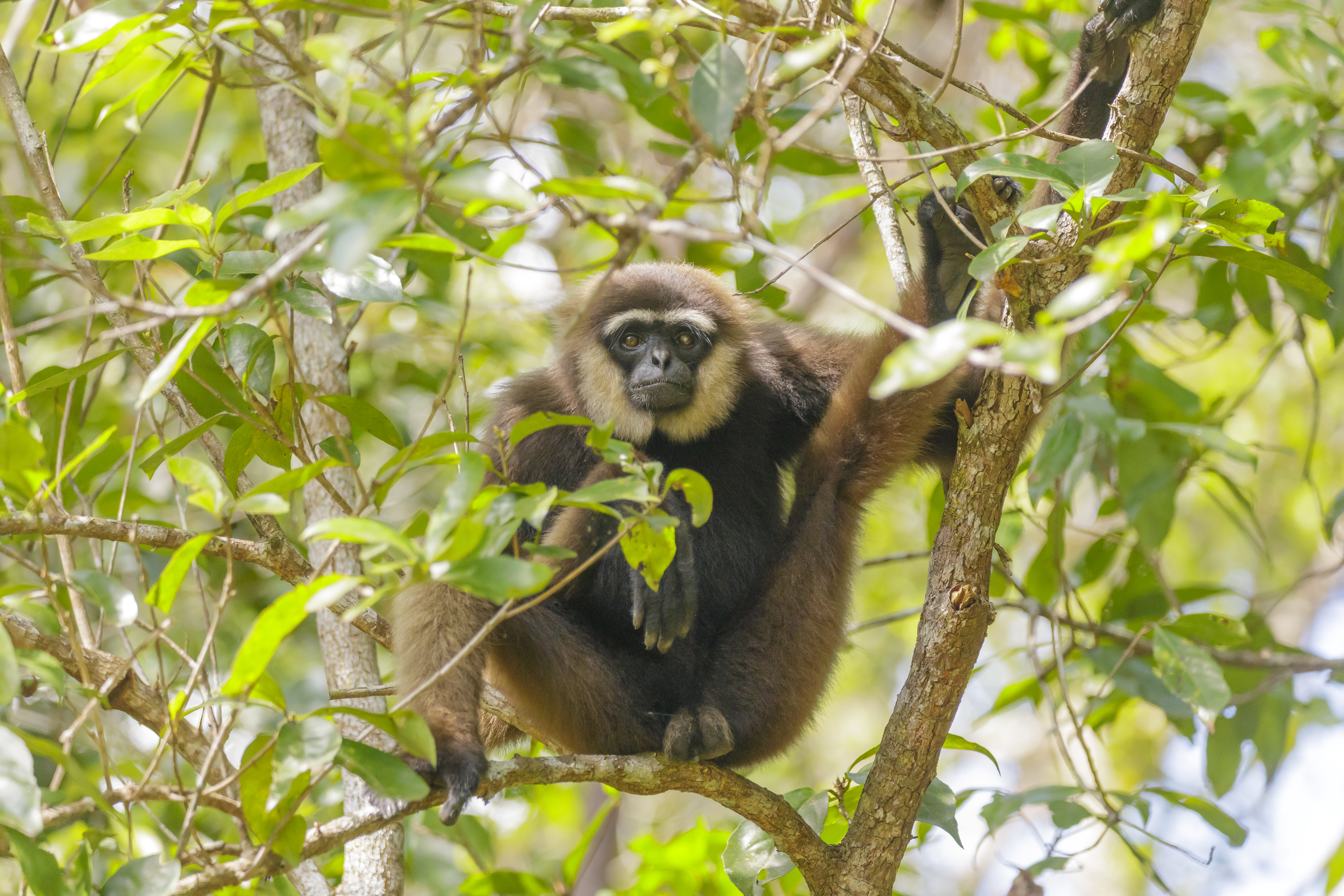
- Bornean white-bearded gibbon (Hylobates albibarbis) in Tanjung Puting National Park

Conservation status
- Endangered (IUCN 3.1)
- CITES Appendix I

Scientific classification
- Kingdom: Animalia
- Phylum: Chordata
- Class: Mammalia
- Infraclass: Placentalia
- Order: Primates
- Superfamily: Hominoidea
- Family: Hylobatidae
- Genus: Hylobates
- Species: H. albibarbis

Binomial name
- Hylobates albibarbis Lyon, 1911
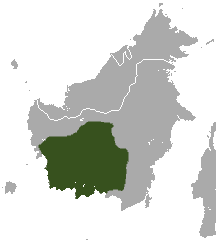
- Range of Bornean white-bearded gibbon (green)

= Bornean white-bearded gibbon =

Species of ape

The Bornean white-bearded gibbon (Hylobates albibarbis), also known as the Bornean agile gibbon or southern gibbon, is a species of gibbon endemic to southern Borneo. It is an endangered species, due to the ongoing logging of tropical forests between the Kapuas and Barito rivers. Additional issues of concern to the endangerment of white-bearded gibbons also threaten other arboreal primates.

The white-bearded gibbon is very similar to other gibbons in their behaviour and their frugivorous diet. The Bornean white-bearded gibbon was formerly considered a subspecies of the agile gibbon but based on recent DNA research, some now classify it as a separate species.

== Description and life history ==
The Bornean white-bearded gibbon is commonly seen with grey or dark brown fur, a black face, and white beard. Similar to other gibbons, these gibbons are a smaller ape that is tailless. They tend to live in small family groups consisting of a male, female, and their offspring. They express pair-bonding relationships and they do not make nests. Their mode of transportation is called brachiation, where they swing from branches to get around. They have been documented to swing up to 15 meters (49.2 feet) in a single leap and as fast as 55 kilometers (34 miles) per hour. Apart from other primates, all gibbons walk bipedally; holding their long arms over their heads.

The average life span for a white-bearded gibbon is 25 years, and it grows to anywhere from 17 to 25 inches (43 to 64 cm). Male white-bearded gibbons weigh about 6.1 to 6.9 kg (13.5 to 15.2 pounds), and females weigh 5.5 to 6.4 kg (12 to 14 pounds). Female white-bearded gibbons tend to reach sexual maturity in about 48 months.

== Diet ==
The Bornean white-bearded gibbons' diet in the tropical forest tends to be frugivorous, where they depend on the abundance of fruit trees and figs; making their diet 65% fruit and 23% figs, respectively. They will occasionally supplement their diet with leaves and insects.

== Threats ==
Logging and mining have created a threatening environment in Borneo for gibbons and all arboreal creatures. Since gibbons rely on dense and tall forest areas for safety and for travelling, this is a leading problem for the survival of white-bearded gibbons. Additional threats for the white-bearded gibbon include forest fires due to El Niño events and climate change.
