= Yunnan lar gibbon =

Conservation status
- Data Deficient (IUCN 3.1)

Scientific classification
- Kingdom: Animalia
- Phylum: Chordata
- Class: Mammalia
- Order: Primates
- Superfamily: Hominoidea
- Family: Hylobatidae
- Genus: Hylobates
- Species: H. lar
- Subspecies: H. l. yunnanensis

Trinomial name
- Hylobates lar yunnanensis Ma & Wang, 1986
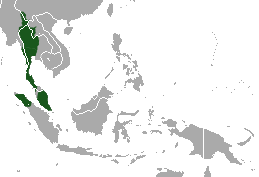
- Lar Gibbon range, including Yunnan

Subspecies of ape

The Yunnan lar gibbon (Hylobates lar yunnanensis), also known as the Yunnan white-handed gibbon, is a subspecies of the lar gibbon, a primate in the gibbon family, Hylobatidae. This Chinese subspecies is thought to be extinct.

== Taxonomy ==
This animal from Yunnan is listed as a distinct subspecies of the lar gibbon in recent taxonomic articles. However, there is still debate about the validity of this classification.

== Appearance ==
This subspecies is distinguished from the other lar gibbon subspecies by its longer dorsal hair, shorter light hair-base, and red-brown or dark-brown pubic hair.

== Status ==
The Nangunhe Nature Reserve in Southwest Yunnan has been the last stronghold of the Yunnan lar gibbon. During a survey from 4 to 18 November 2007, no evidence of the survival of the Yunnan lar gibbon could be found and the scientists of this survey tentatively concluded the lar gibbon has become extinct in China, and the Yunnan subspecies globally. The 2008 IUCN Red List of Threatened Species has listed this subspecies as data deficient "as its taxonomic and geographic limits are not well defined, but population sizes are by all accounts critical, and the remaining populations are near extinction."
