= Quadrumana =

Obsolete primate taxon

Quadrumana is an outdated taxonomic division within the primates. The division of "Quadrumana" from "Bimana" was an attempt at distinguishing Homo sapiens from the rest of the great apes. For a century, modern science has considered humans as part of the great apes.

Quadrumana is Latin for "four-handed ones", which was a term used for Lemurs, monkeys and apes since their feet are prehensile and similar to hands. It was not clear at the time that Tarsiers belonged as well in this group, as sister of the monkeys (incl. apes). A similar term, quadrumanous, is used to describe locomotion involving both using feet and using hands to grasp at branches. Bimana is Latin for "two-handed ones".

The division was proposed by Johann Friedrich Blumenbach in the first edition of his Manual of Natural History (1779) and taken up by other naturalists, most notably Georges Cuvier. Some elevated the distinction to the level of an order.

However, the many affinities between humans and other primates – and especially the great apes – made it clear that the distinction made no scientific sense. In 1863, however, Thomas Henry Huxley in his Evidence as to Man's Place in Nature demonstrated that the higher apes might fairly be included in Bimana. Charles Darwin wrote, in The Descent of Man (1871):

The greater number of naturalists who have taken into consideration the whole structure of man, including his mental faculties, have followed Blumenbach and Cuvier, and have placed man in a separate Order, under the title of the Bimana, and therefore on an equality with the orders of the Quadrumana, Carnivora, etc. Recently many of our best naturalists have recurred to the view first propounded by Linnaeus, so remarkable for his sagacity, and have placed man in the same Order with the Quadrumana, under the title of the Primates. The justice of this conclusion will be admitted: for in the first place, we must bear in mind the comparative insignificance for classification of the great development of the brain in man, and that the strongly marked differences between the skulls of man and the Quadrumana (lately insisted upon by Bischoff, Aeby, and others) apparently follow from their differently developed brains. In the second place, we must remember that nearly all the other and more important differences between man and the Quadrumana are manifestly adaptive in their nature, and relate chiefly to the erect position of man; such as the structure of his hand, foot, and pelvis, the curvature of his spine, and the position of his head.
