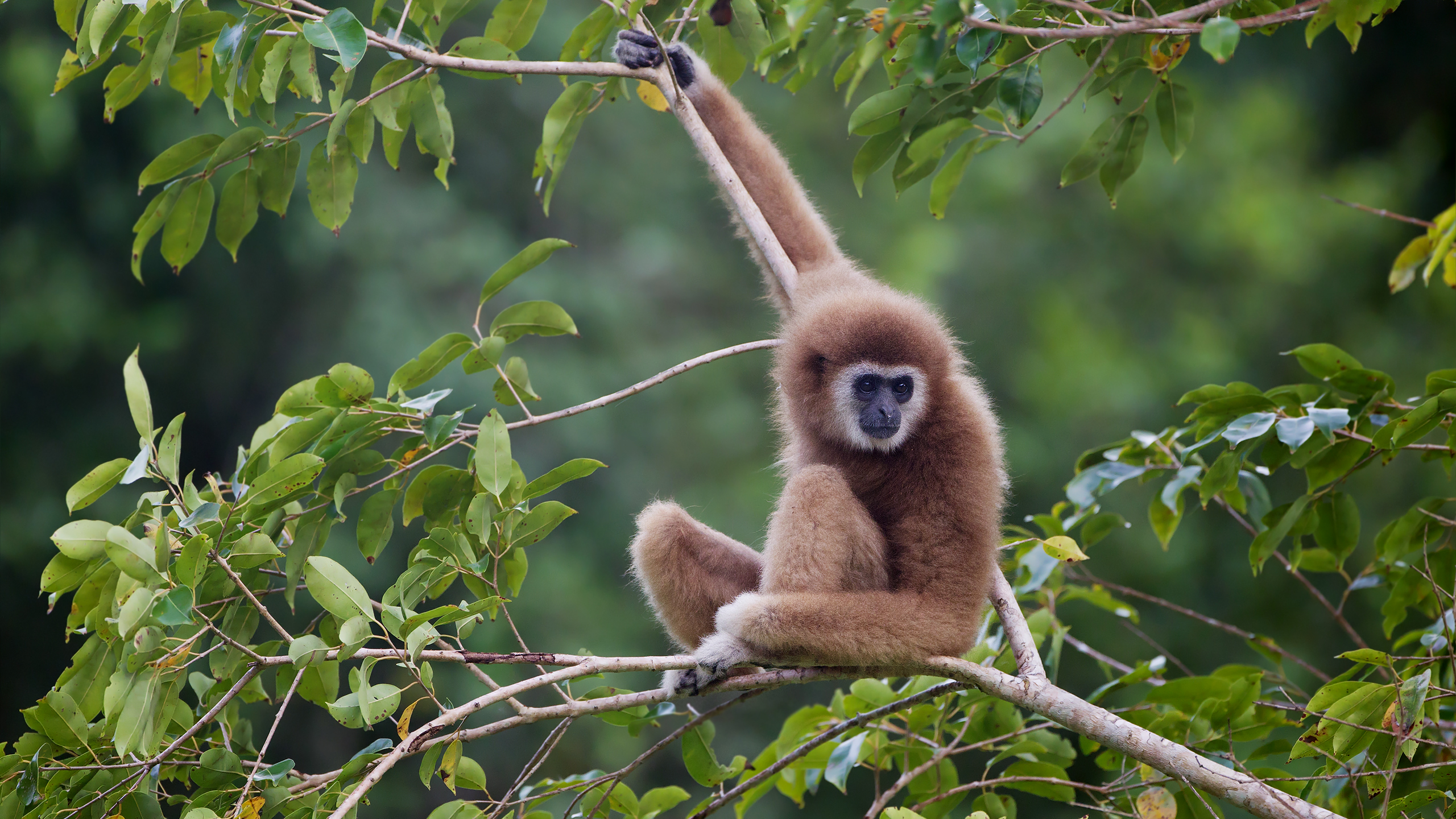

Conservation status
- Vulnerable (IUCN 3.1)

Scientific classification
- Kingdom: Animalia
- Phylum: Chordata
- Class: Mammalia
- Order: Primates
- Superfamily: Hominoidea
- Family: Hylobatidae
- Genus: Hylobates
- Species: H. lar
- Subspecies: H. l. entelloides

Trinomial name
- Hylobates lar entelloides I. Geoffroy, 1842

= Central lar gibbon =

Species of ape

The central lar gibbon (Hylobates lar entelloides) is a subspecies of white-handed or lar gibbon that is vulnerable to extinction. It is endemic to Malaysia, Myanmar, and Thailand. Central lar gibbons tend to live in dense forest areas where there is an abundance of vegetation. This helps the gibbons to be protected from predators and helps them effectively use their brachiation ability (swinging from tree to tree) to navigate long distances within dense forest areas.
