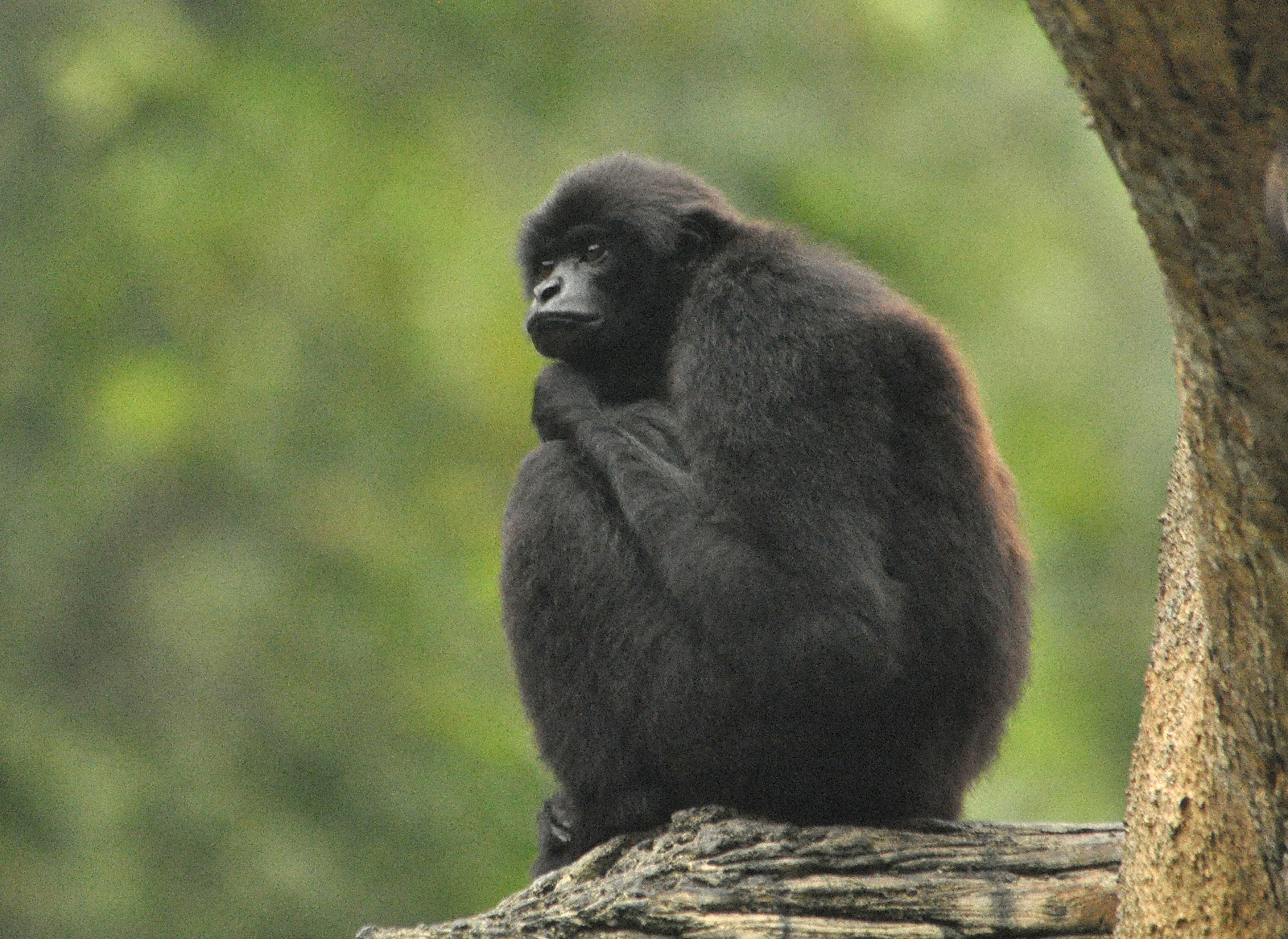

Conservation status
- Endangered (IUCN 3.1)
- CITES Appendix I

Scientific classification
- Kingdom: Animalia
- Phylum: Chordata
- Class: Mammalia
- Infraclass: Placentalia
- Order: Primates
- Superfamily: Hominoidea
- Family: Hylobatidae
- Genus: Hylobates
- Species: H. klossii

Binomial name
- Hylobates klossii (Miller, 1903)
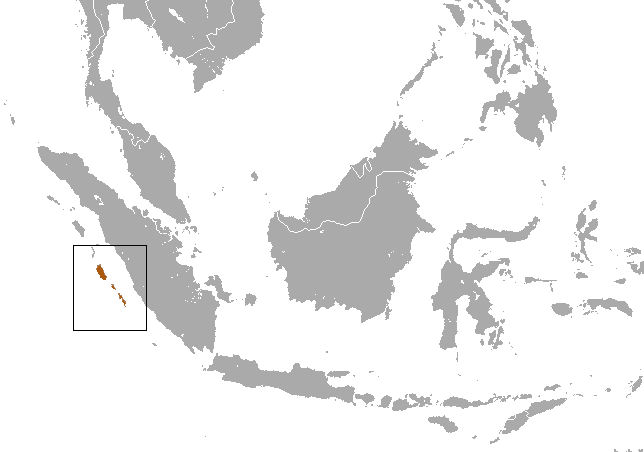
- Kloss's gibbon range

= Kloss's gibbon =

Species of ape

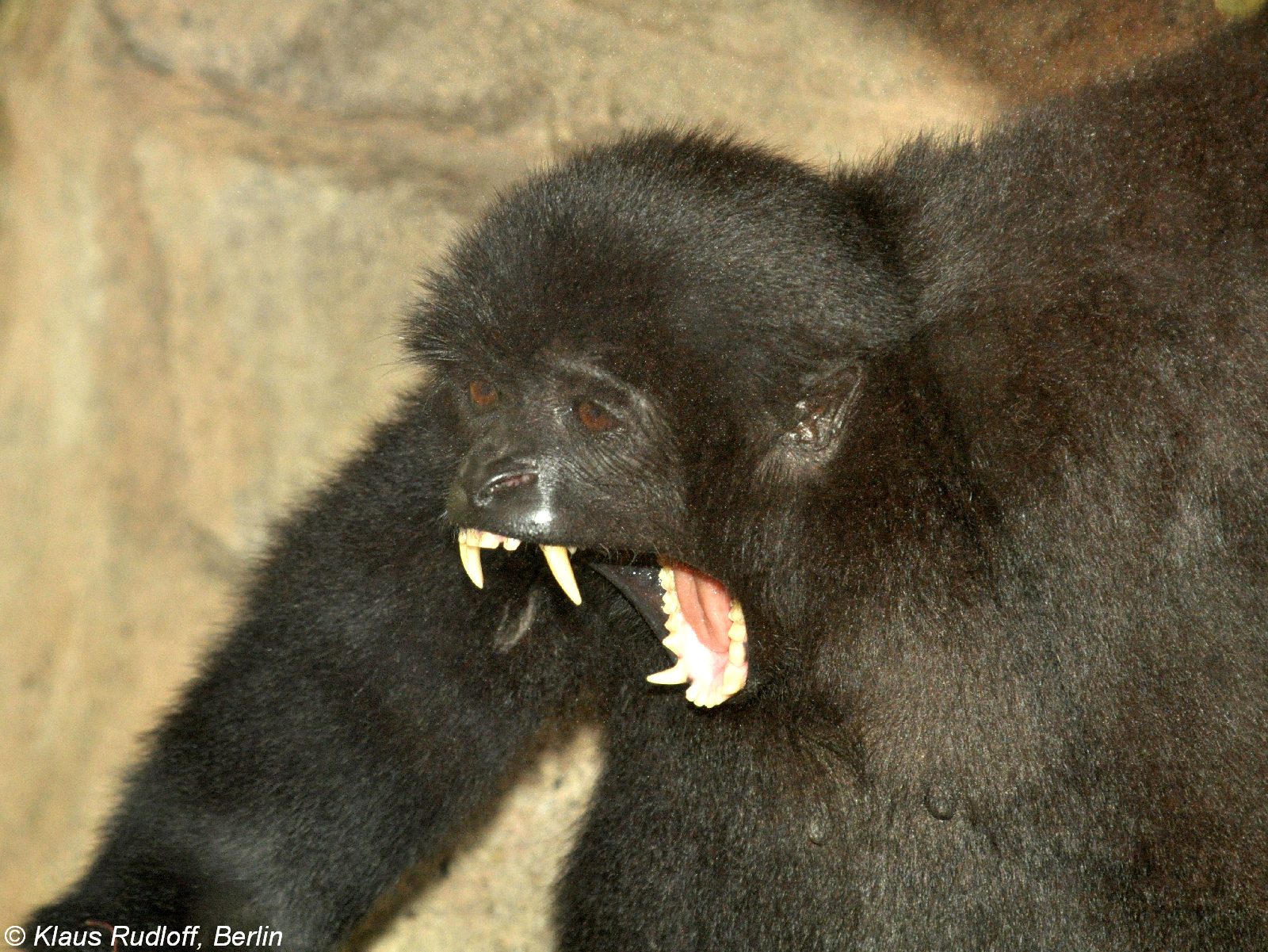
Kloss's gibbon

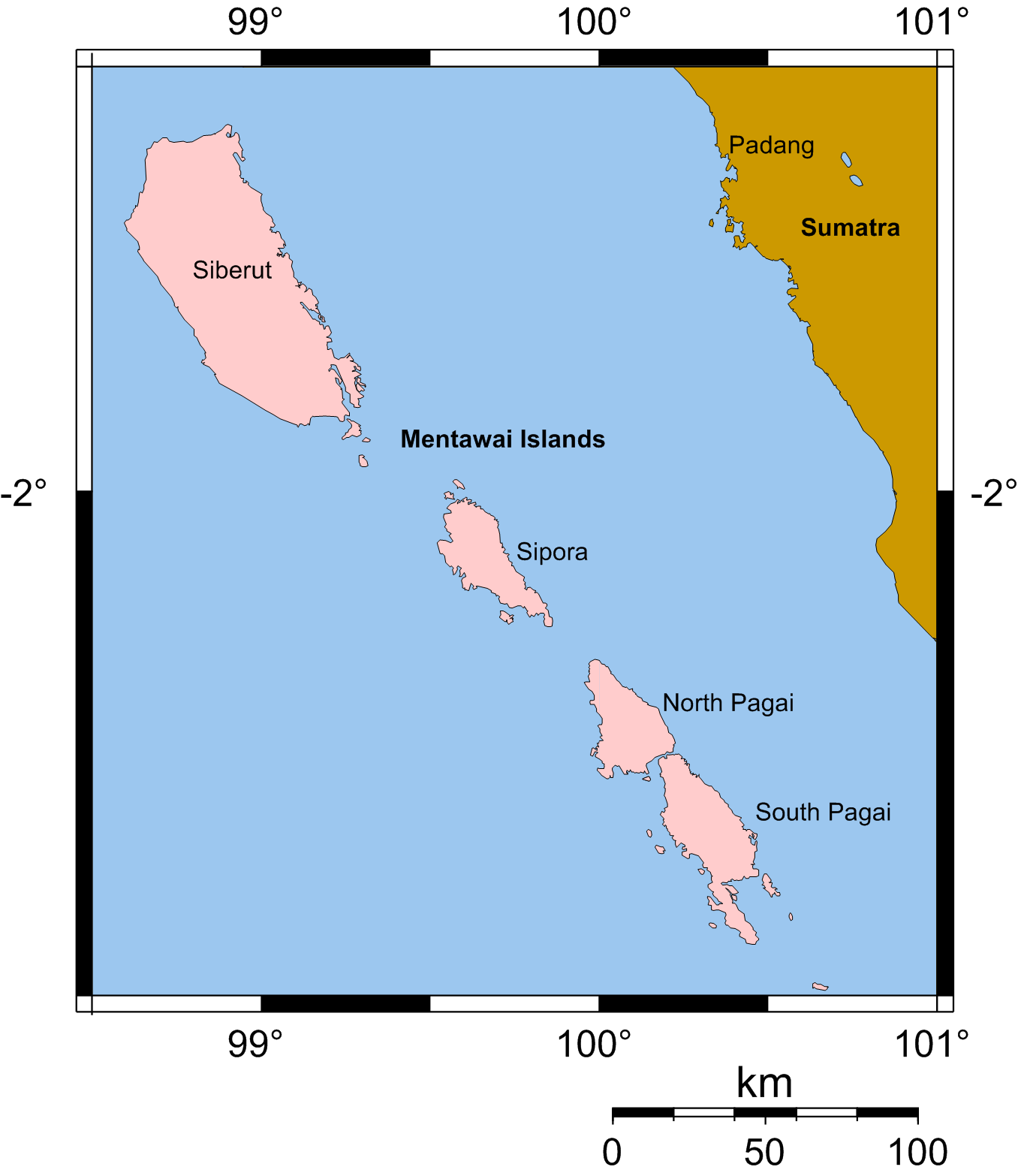
The Mentawai Islands

Kloss's gibbon (Hylobates klossii), also known as the Mentawai gibbon, the bilou or dwarf siamang, is an endangered primate in the gibbon family, Hylobatidae. It is identifiable in that it is all black, resembling the siamang with its black fur, but is considerably smaller and lacks the siamang's distinctive throat pouch. Kloss's gibbon reaches a size 17 to 25 inches (43 to 64 cm) and weigh at most 13 pounds (5.9 kg). As is the case for all gibbons, they have long arms and no tail. Males and females are difficult to distinguish.

== Habitat ==
Kloss's gibbon exclusively lives on the Mentawai Islands that lie to the west of Sumatra. The Mentawai Islands consist four main islands that are part of an island archipelago. These islands are hearths of biodiversity, and are the homes of many endemic species. It is a diurnal inhabitant of the rain forest that hangs in the trees from its long arms and rarely comes to the ground. Because Kloss's gibbon rarely comes out of the canopy, these gibbons use tree limbs to cross obstacles like bodies of water. Like all species of gibbons it lives together in pairs that stake out a territory from approximately 49 to 74 acres (20 to 30 ha) of size. This area is defended vehemently against other gibbons. Its diet consists mainly of fruits, occasionally also eating different plant parts, bird eggs, insects and small vertebrates.

== Communication ==
Kloss's gibbon are unique gibbons because the two sexes do not vocalize songs in unison. Male Kloss's gibbon sing before the sun rises and female Kloss's gibbon vocalize songs once the sun has risen. Female Kloss's gibbon calls are unique and have slight variations in the different stages of the call. The calls emitted by the females could offer other members of the species information about their position in the canopy.

== Reproduction ==
The reproductive cycle of Kloss's gibbon is similar to that of other gibbons. Every two to three years the female may give birth to a single young (with a gestation period of seven months). The young is weaned in the middle of its second year, and is fully mature in about seven years. Their life expectancy is about 25 years in the wild, and up to 40 years in captivity. Kloss's gibbons are monogamous, and male Kloss's gibbons use territory to attract and court possible mates. Territories are often contested and Kloss's gibbons defend their territories with aggression and threats. During courtship, males and females defend territory together, and mating only occurs after the females deems the male capable of defending a suitable territory.

== Diet ==
Kloss's gibbon are picky eaters, and never consume over-ripened fruit. Kloss's gibbons diet consists of fruit, leaves, shoots, and insects. Kloss's gibbons favorite fruit is figs, but these gibbons do not spend a lot of time eating figs because figs are scarce on the Mentawai Islands.

== Behavior ==
When Kloss's gibbons are observed by human researchers, they adapt and become less afraid, a process called habituation. Kloss's gibbons can become habituated to humans and will not flee when they are observed. Unhabituated Kloss's gibbons sometimes exhibit a warning behavior in which they act as a lure toward people. One male gibbon will produce warning calls and attract attention to himself while other members of his group make their escape. Kloss's gibbons behavior help it stay cryptic, possibly to help them avoid hunting pressure. Female Kloss's gibbons sing less frequently than males, and males only sing in the predawn when visibility isn't optimal for hunting. Kloss's gibbons also exhibit less aggregate behavior like grooming and playing, possibly to reduce their visibility and stay hidden from hunters.

== Conservation ==
Kloss's gibbon is in jeopardy of going extinct. Kloss's gibbon is classified as endangered by the IUCN (2021). Recent estimates conclude that there are around 20,000 to 25,000 Kloss's gibbons alive in the wild, and its numbers are declining. Over the last two and a half decades, the population size of Kloss's gibbon has fallen by 50%. There are several threats that pose significant risk to Kloss's gibbon. Kloss's gibbon has no natural predators, and humans are the main threat to the existence of this primate. Native peoples of the Mentawai Islands kill Kloss's gibbon and other endemic primates for subsistence, and also participate in poaching activities. Globalization and industrialization in the Mentawai Islands are contributing toward the degradation of high quality habitat needed by Kloss's gibbon. Road development and the adoption of air rifles are allowing natives to kill Kloss's gibbon easier and at higher rates. Kloss's gibbon spends the majority of its time in the tree canopy, and as a result, this species requires undisturbed, old-growth forest habitats to sustain itself. Kloss's gibbon is at risk due to habitat loss, as its homeland islands are suffering from deforestation. Conservationists focused on improving Kloss's gibbons endangered status need to protect and preserve the high quality habitat needed by these gibbons. Fragments of habitat need to be connected to allow movement without risk of exposure in highly modified areas. Local government has been cooperating with global organizations such as UNESCO to raise awareness as well as increase the amount of protected land in the Mentawai Islands.
