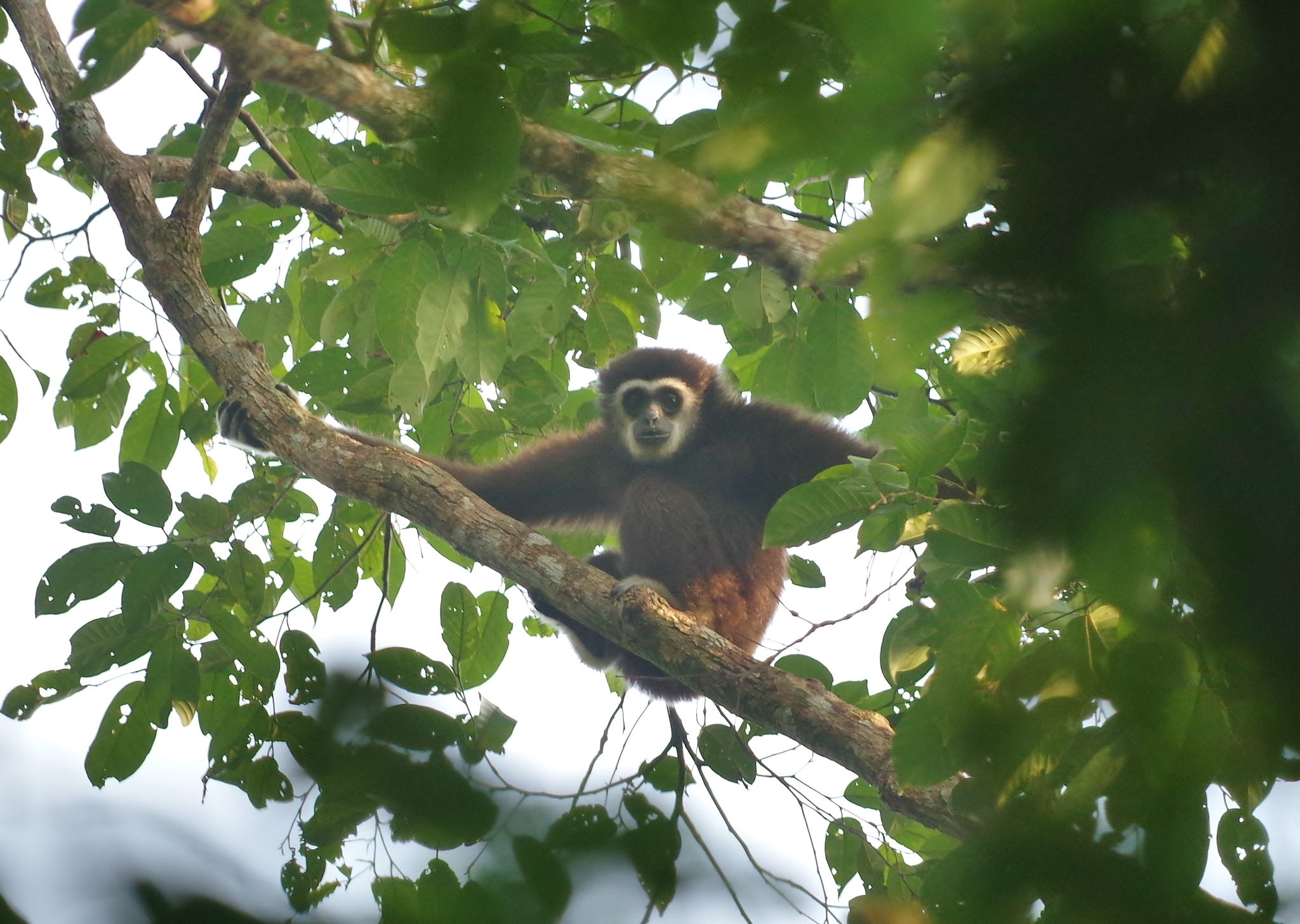

Conservation status
- Endangered (IUCN 3.1)

Scientific classification
- Kingdom: Animalia
- Phylum: Chordata
- Class: Mammalia
- Order: Primates
- Suborder: Haplorhini
- Infraorder: Simiiformes
- Family: Hylobatidae
- Genus: Hylobates
- Species: H. lar
- Subspecies: H. l. lar

Trinomial name
- Hylobates lar lar Linnaeus, 1771

= Malaysian lar gibbon =

Species of ape

The Malaysian lar gibbon (Hylobates lar lar) is an endangered subspecies of white-handed or lar gibbon. It is endemic to Malaysia, and Thailand.

The Malaysian lar gibbon often chooses taller canopy trees at locations with higher elevation for making calls. This subspecies also utilizes topographically convex areas, like hill tops and ridges, as the chosen locations over more concave areas, as it makes the calling location even taller. The reason why white-handed gibbon species, such as the Malaysian lar gibbon, prefer certain calling locations in higher areas, is because fewer obstacles physically intercept transmission of their calls, as reported in sound propagation studies of other primates.
