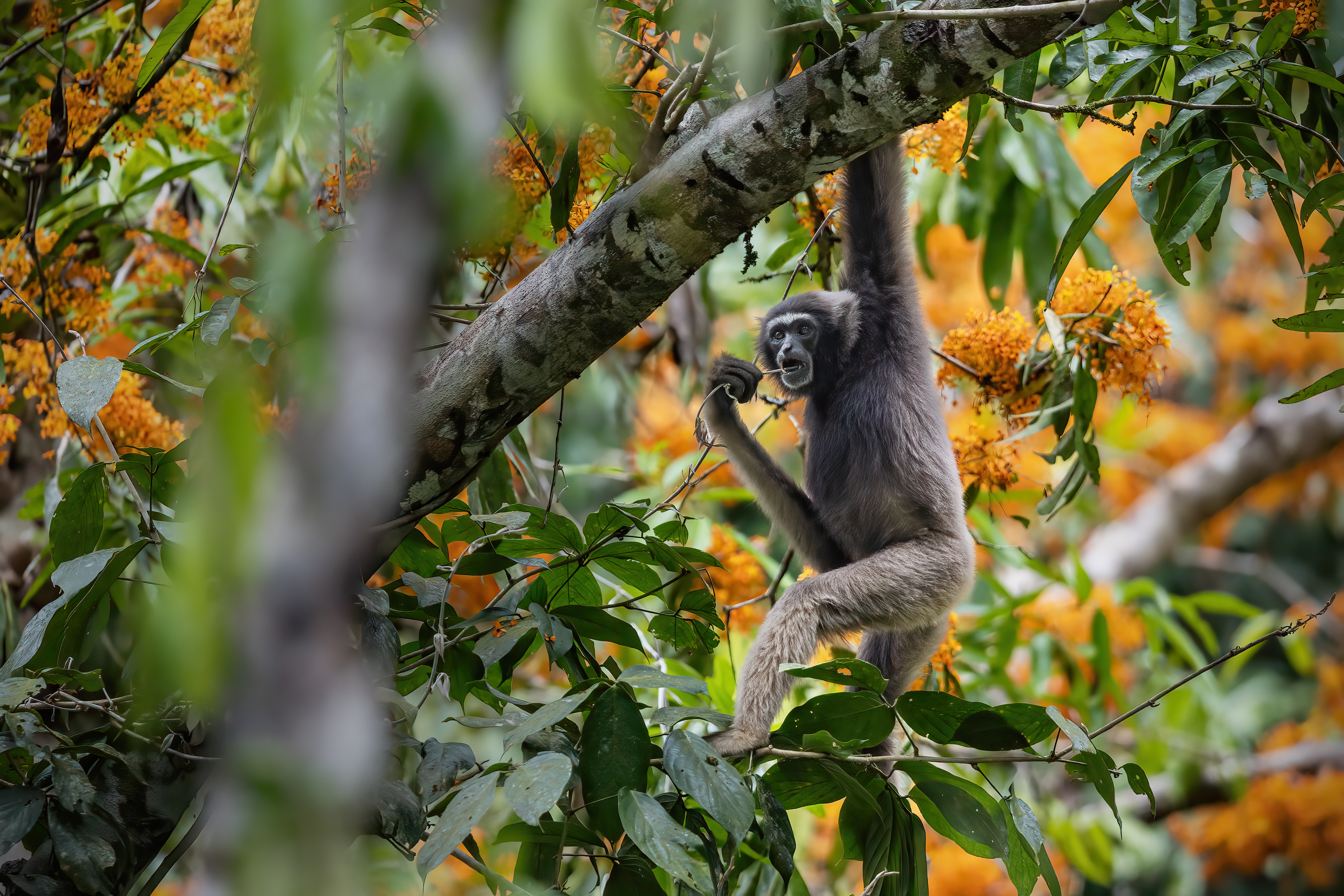

Conservation status
- Endangered (IUCN 3.1)
- CITES Appendix I

Scientific classification
- Kingdom: Animalia
- Phylum: Chordata
- Class: Mammalia
- Infraclass: Placentalia
- Order: Primates
- Superfamily: Hominoidea
- Family: Hylobatidae
- Genus: Hylobates
- Species: H. muelleri

Binomial name
- Hylobates muelleri Martin, 1841
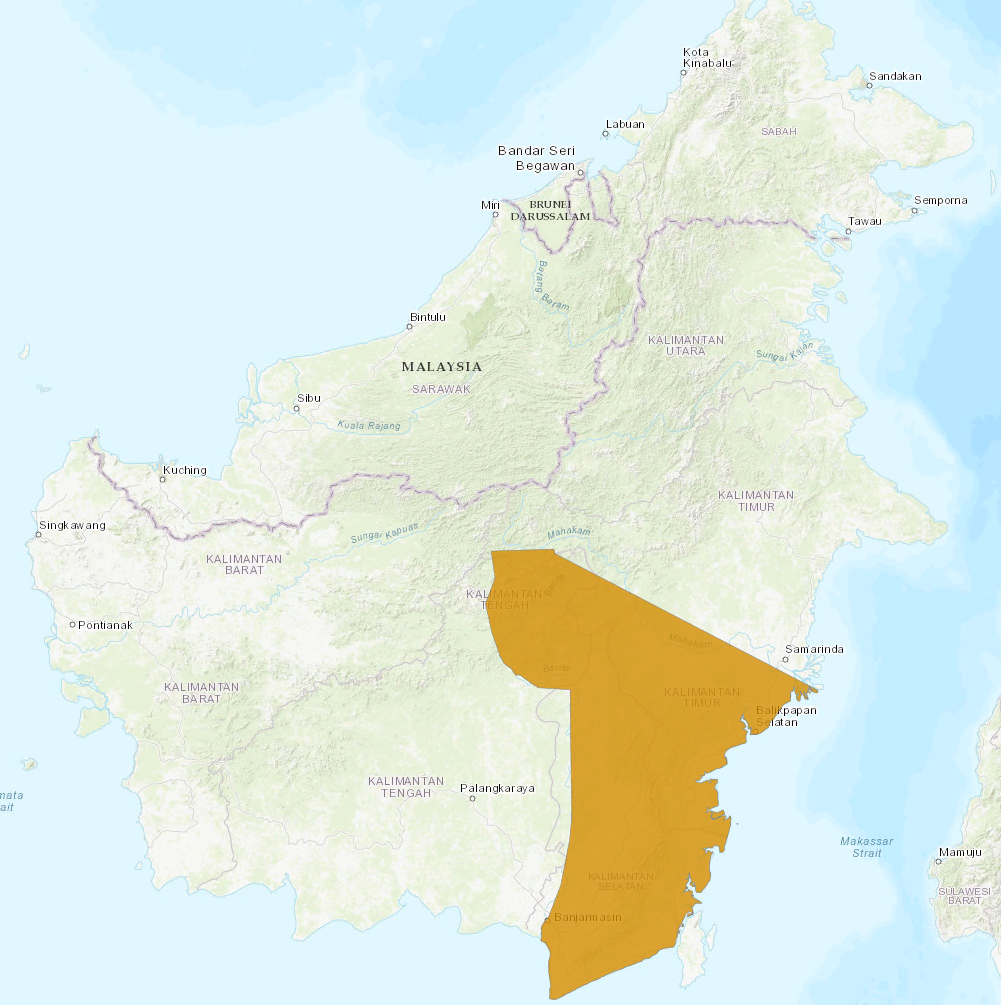
- Müller's gibbon range

= Müller's gibbon =

Species of ape

Müller's gibbon (Hylobates muelleri), also known as the southern grey gibbon, is a primate in the gibbon family, Hylobatidae.

== Taxonomy ==
Formerly, the western grey gibbon (H. abbotti) and eastern grey gibbon (H. funereus) were considered conspecific with H. muelleri, but more recent studies indicate that all three are distinct species, and both the IUCN Red List and the American Society of Mammalogists consider them such.

== Description ==
Unlike most gibbon species, Müller's gibbon does not show sexual dimorphism in its fur coloration. Its fur is grey- or brown-colored with a ring of bright fur around its face. On the head, it often has a darkly colored cap. Weighing between 4–8 kg, it ranks among the smaller of the gibbons.

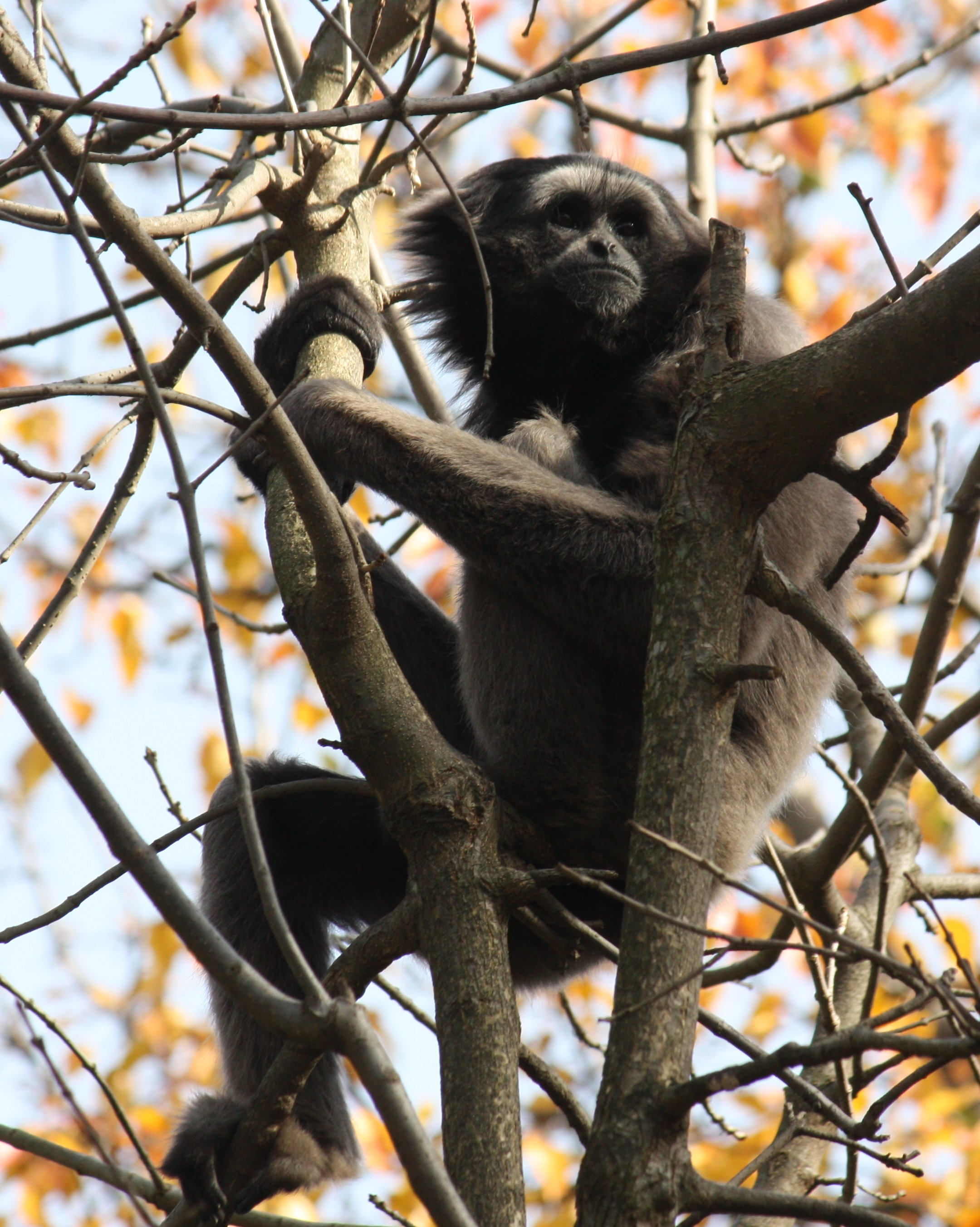
Captive

== Distribution and habitat ==
Müller's gibbon is endemic to Kalimantan in the island of Borneo, inhabiting the southeastern part of the island. It is found approximately south of the Mahakam River and east of the Barito River.

== Behaviour ==
Southern grey gibbons are diurnal rain forest dwellers, characterized by the long arms that all gibbons have, with which they brachiate through the trees. They live together in monogamous pairs, and defend their family territory against intruders with long, loud singing. Their diet consists primarily of fruits. Little is known about the reproductive patterns of this species, but it is thought to be similar to that of other gibbon species.
