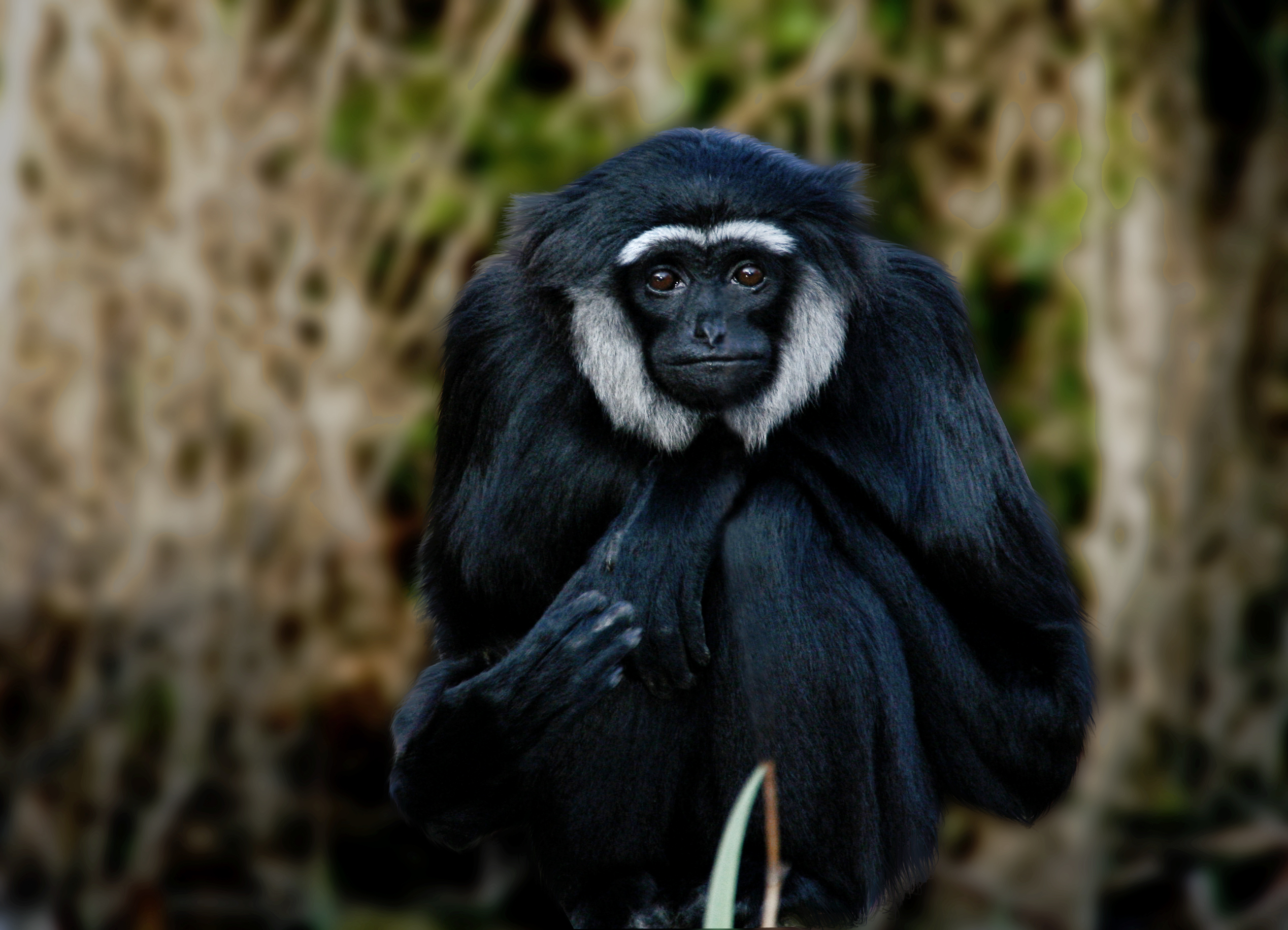
- Male at Bristol Zoo
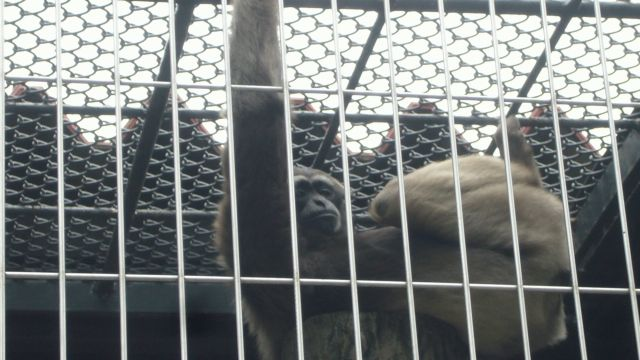
- Female at Tobu Zoo

Conservation status
- Endangered (IUCN 3.1)
- CITES Appendix I

Scientific classification
- Kingdom: Animalia
- Phylum: Chordata
- Class: Mammalia
- Order: Primates
- Superfamily: Hominoidea
- Family: Hylobatidae
- Genus: Hylobates
- Species: H. agilis

Binomial name
- Hylobates agilis F. Cuvier, 1821
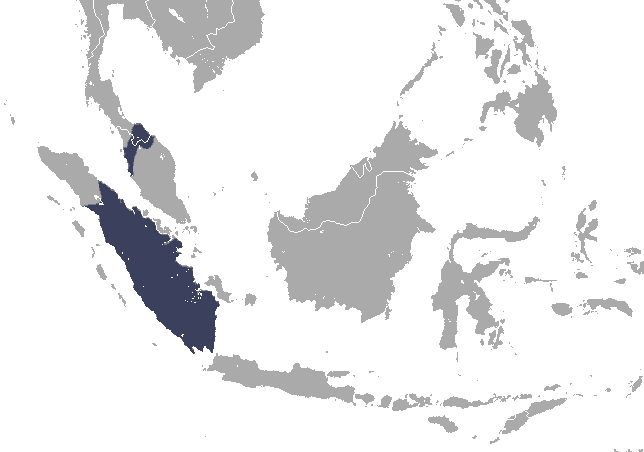
- Agile gibbon range

Synonyms
- albo griseus Ludeking, 1862; albo nigrescens Ludeking, 1862; rafflei É. Geoffroy, 1828; unko Lesson, 1829

= Agile gibbon =

Species of ape

Hylobates agilis singing

The agile gibbon (Hylobates agilis), also called the black-handed gibbon, is an Old World primate, and is a part of the gibbon family. It is native to Indonesia, specifically, on the island of Sumatra. The agile gibbon can also be found in Malaysia, and southern Thailand. As appointed by the IUCN Red List, this species is endangered, and mainly due to the destruction of their habitat and pet trade.

== Taxonomy ==
The species is generally thought not to have subspecies, but some experts recognise a mountain form and a lowland form.

- Mountain agile gibbon, Hylobates agilis agilis
- Lowland agile gibbon, Hylobates agilis unko

== Description ==
The agile gibbon has fur varying in color from black to red-brown. The brow is white, and the male can be recognized by his white or light-grey cheeks. Additionally, the male is slightly larger than the female. The agile gibbon weighs from 4 to 6 kg (8.8 to 13.2 lb) with an average of 5 kg (11 lb), though in captivity it can reach 8 kg (18 lb). It has a head and body length of 44–63.5 cm (17.3–25.0 in). Like all gibbons, it is tailless.

== Behaviour ==
With its long arms they swing on branches, brachiating at a fast pace. Like all gibbons, it lives in monogamous pairs in a strict enforced territory, which is defended with vigorous visual displays and songs. The diet of the agile gibbon is generally frugivorous but have also been observed eating leaves, flowers, and insects.

Females give birth to a single offspring after seven months' gestation. The young gibbon is weaned at barely 2 years of age. When fully mature, at about 8 years, it leaves its family group in order to look for a mate.

== Distribution and habitat ==
The agile gibbon is found on Sumatra southeast of Lake Toba and the Singkil River, in a small area on the Malay Peninsula, and south Thailand near the Malaysian border. It predominantly lives arboreally in rain forests and rarely comes to the ground.
