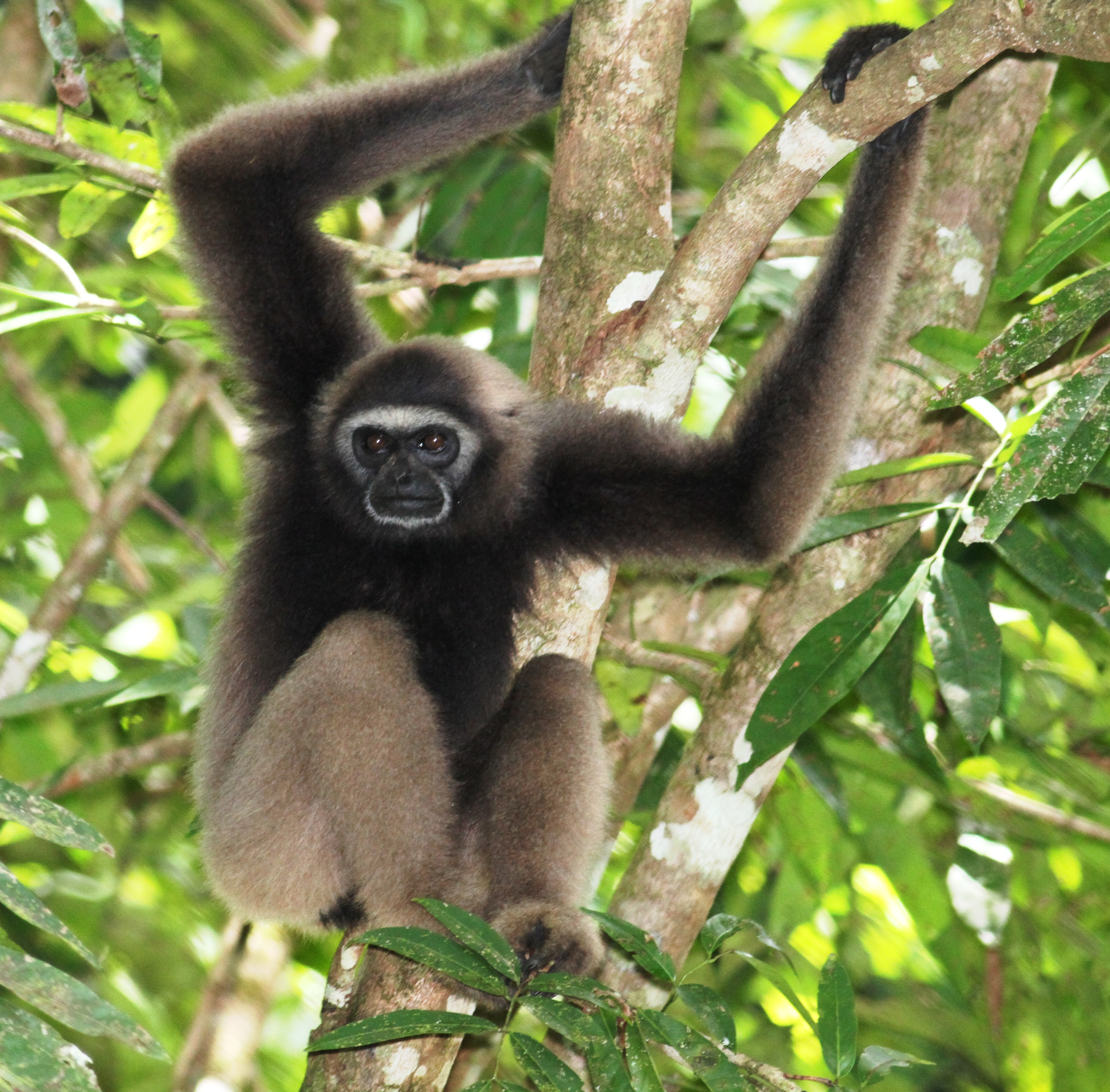

Conservation status
- Endangered (IUCN 3.1)
- CITES Appendix I

Scientific classification
- Kingdom: Animalia
- Phylum: Chordata
- Class: Mammalia
- Infraclass: Placentalia
- Order: Primates
- Superfamily: Hominoidea
- Family: Hylobatidae
- Genus: Hylobates
- Species: H. funereus

Binomial name
- Hylobates funereus I. Geoffroy, 1850
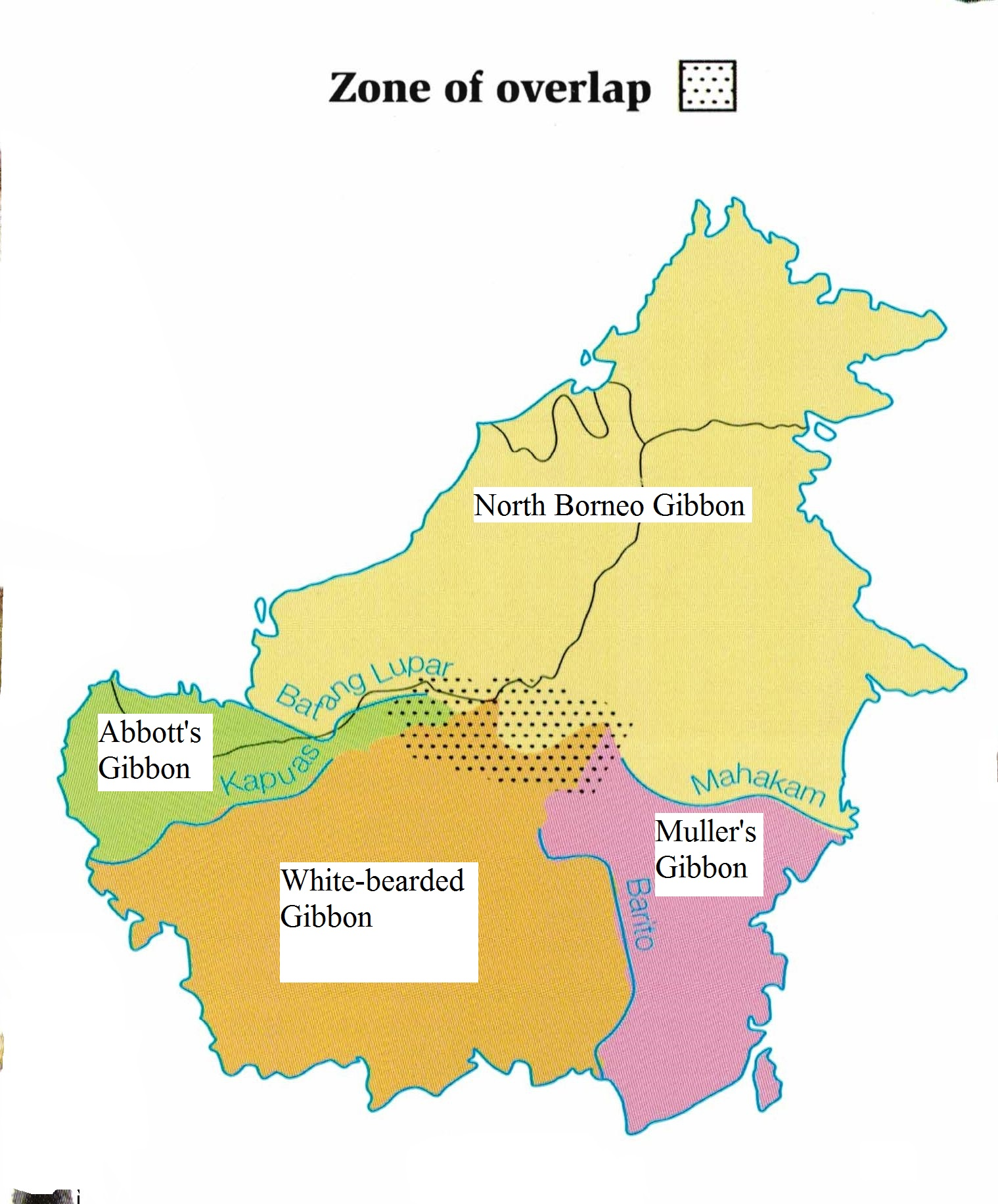
- Northern grey gibbon range in yellow

= Eastern grey gibbon =

Species of mammal

The eastern grey gibbon or northern grey gibbon (Hylobates funereus) is a primate in the gibbon family, Hylobatidae.

== Taxonomy ==
Formerly, the eastern grey gibbon and western grey gibbon (H. abbotti) were considered conspecific with the southern grey gibbon (H. muelleri), but more recent studies indicate that all three are distinct species, and both the IUCN Red List and the American Society of Mammalogists consider them such. However, they can still hybridize with one another where their ranges meet.

== Distribution ==
It is endemic to northeastern Borneo, and is found in Kalimantan, Sarawak, and Brunei. It ranges from Sabah south to the Mahakam River in East Kalimantan, and west to Baram in Sarawak.

== Conservation ==
As with the other two grey gibbons, this species is thought to be endangered due to heavy deforestation in Borneo, as well as increases in forest fires exacerbated by El Niño events. It is also threatened by illegal hunting and capture for the pet trade.
