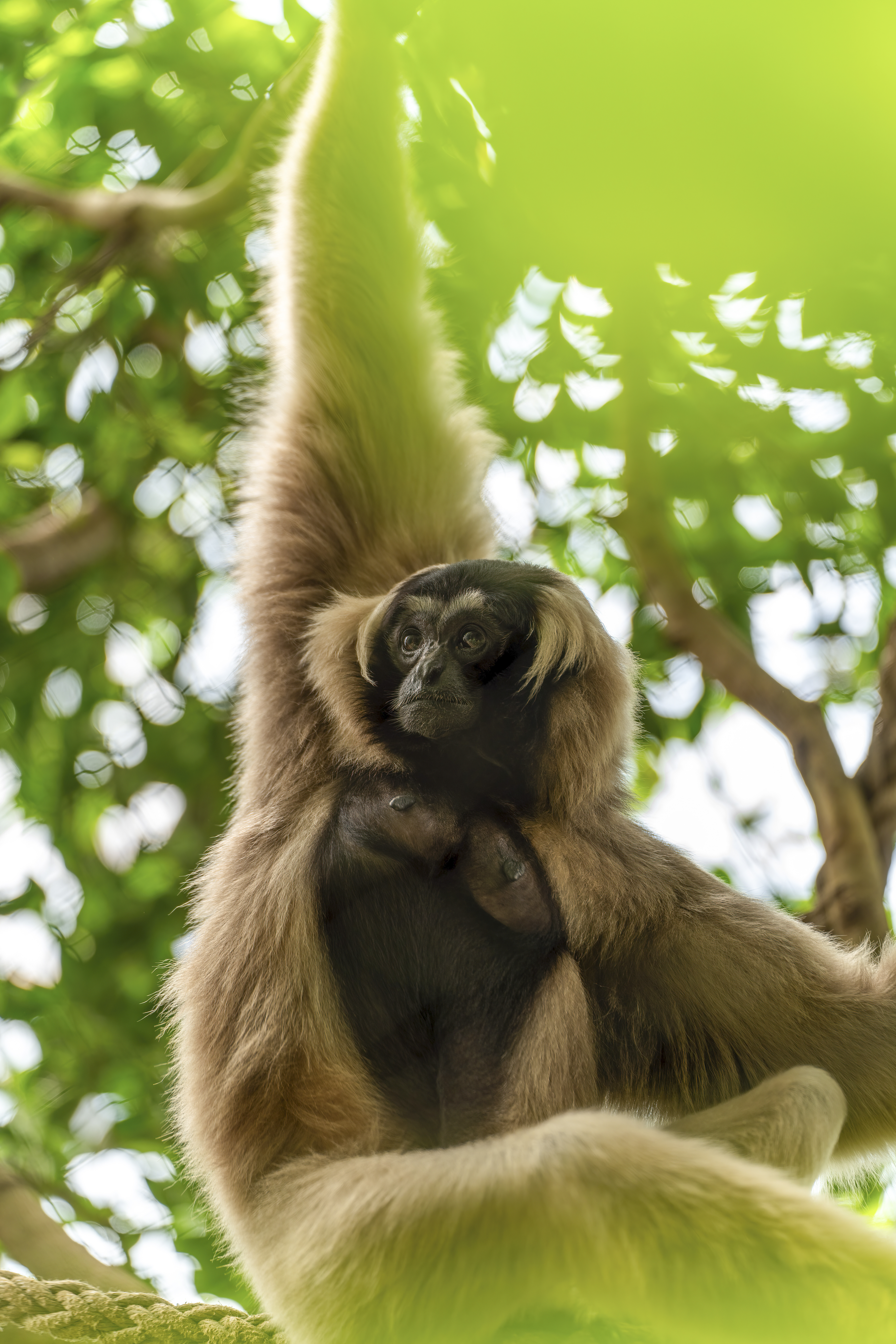
- A pileated gibbon (Hylobates pileatus) female hanging from tree

Scientific classification
- Kingdom: Animalia
- Phylum: Chordata
- Class: Mammalia
- Infraclass: Placentalia
- Order: Primates
- Superfamily: Hominoidea
- Family: Hylobatidae
- Genus: Hylobates; Illiger, 1811

Type species
- Homo lar Linnaeus, 1771

Species
- Hylobates lar; Hylobates agilis; Hylobates albibarbis; Hylobates abbotti; Hylobates funereus; Hylobates muelleri; Hylobates moloch; Hylobates pileatus; Hylobates klossii
- Distribution of Hylobates and its species (note: Bornean population formerly included in H. agilis is now generally considered a separate species, H. albibarbis; H. muelleri is now split into H. muelleri, H. abbotti, and H. funereus)

= Hylobates =

Genus of apes

The genus Hylobates (/ˌhaɪloʊˈbeɪtiːz/) is one of the four genera of gibbons. Its name means "forest walker", from the Greek hūlē (ὕλη, "forest") and bates (βάτης, "one who treads").

It was once considered the only genus, but recently its subgenera (Hoolock [formerly Bunopithecus], Nomascus, and Symphalangus) have been elevated to the genus level. Hylobates remains the most species-rich and widespread of gibbon genera, ranging from southern China (Yunnan) to western and central Java.

Individuals within this genus are characterized by 44 chromosomes and often have a ring of white fur around their faces.

== Classification ==
- Family Hylobatidae: gibbons
  - Genus Hylobates
    - Lar gibbon or white-handed gibbon, Hylobates lar
      - Malaysian lar gibbon, Hylobates lar lar
      - Carpenter's lar gibbon, Hylobates lar carpenteri
      - Central lar gibbon, Hylobates lar entelloides
      - Sumatran lar gibbon, Hylobates lar vestitus
      - Yunnan lar gibbon, Hylobates lar yunnanensis
    - Bornean white-bearded gibbon, Hylobates albibarbis
    - Agile gibbon or black-handed gibbon, Hylobates agilis
    - Western grey gibbon or Abbott's grey gibbon, Hylobates abbotti
    - Eastern grey gibbon or northern grey gibbon, Hylobates funereus
    - Müller's gibbon or southern grey gibbon, Hylobates muelleri
    - Silvery gibbon, Hylobates moloch
    - Pileated gibbon or capped gibbon, Hylobates pileatus
    - Kloss's gibbon or Mentawai gibbon, bilou or dwarf siamang, Hylobates klossii
  - Genus Hoolock
  - Genus Symphalangus
  - Genus Nomascus

=== Hybrids ===
Hybrids between Müller's gibbon (H. muelleri) and the Bornean white-bearded gibbon, (H. albibarbis) have been reported in areas of Borneo. A gibbon born at the Kujukushima Zoo in Japan to a female lar or white-handed gibbon (H. lar) was determined to have been fathered by a male agile gibbon (H. agilis).
