= Western grey gibbon =

Conservation status
- Endangered (IUCN 3.1)
- CITES Appendix I

Scientific classification
- Kingdom: Animalia
- Phylum: Chordata
- Class: Mammalia
- Order: Primates
- Superfamily: Hominoidea
- Family: Hylobatidae
- Genus: Hylobates
- Species: H. abbotti

Binomial name
- Hylobates abbotti Kloss, 1929
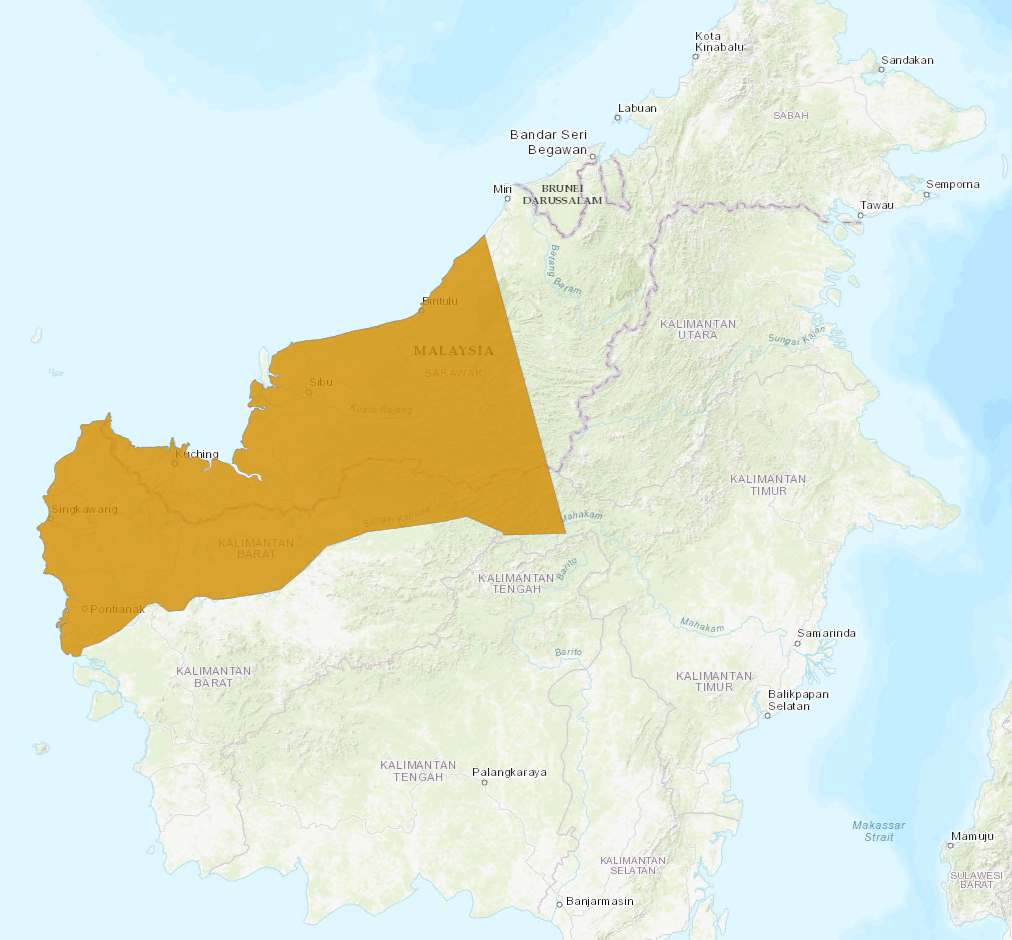
- Western gray gibbon range map Video of Hylobates Abbotti Lulu At The Parc de la tête d'or à Lyon

Species of mammal

The western grey gibbon (Hylobates abbotti), also known as Abbott's grey gibbon, is a primate in the gibbon family, Hylobatidae. It was named after zoologist William Louis Abbott.

== Taxonomy ==
Formerly, the western grey gibbon and northern grey gibbon (H. funereus) were considered conspecific with the southern grey gibbon (H. muelleri), but more recent studies indicate that all three are distinct species, and both the IUCN Red List and the American Society of Mammalogists consider them such.

== Distribution ==
The western grey gibbon is endemic to the western portion of Borneo, where it is found in both Kalimantan and Sarawak. It is found north of the Kapuas River and ranges as far east as Spaoh.

== Conservation ==
This species is thought to be endangered due to heavy deforestation in Borneo, as well as increases in forest fires exacerbated by El Niño events. It is also threatened by illegal hunting and capture for the pet trade.
