= Theodor Ludwig Wilhelm von Bischoff =

German physician and biologist

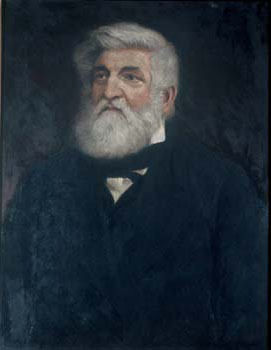
Portrait of Theodor von Bischoff (c. 1870)

Theodor Ludwig Wilhelm von Bischoff (28 October 1807 in Hannover – 5 December 1882 in Munich) was a German medical doctor and biologist.

== Biography ==
He lectured on pathological anatomy at Heidelberg University (1835-1843) and held professorships in anatomy and physiology at the University of Giessen (1843-1855), and the Ludwig-Maximilians-Universität München, where he was appointed to the chair of anatomy and physiology in 1854. In 1843, Theodor von Bischoff was elected as member of the German Academy of Sciences.

His most important contributions were made in embryology with a series of four exhaustive memoirs on the development of the mammalian ovum; published in 1842 (rabbit), 1845 (dog), 1852 (guinea pig), and 1854 (roe deer). His studies concerning animal metabolism by measuring urea were less successful, as was his research on the anatomy of skull and brain.

He was elected a foreign member of the Royal Netherlands Academy of Arts and Sciences in 1878.

== Selected works ==
- Beiträge zur Lehre von den Eyhüllen des menschlichen Fötus, 1834 – Contributions to the study of the human fetus.
- Entwickelungsgeschichte der Säugethiere und des Menschen, 1842 – Developmental history of mammals and man.
- Entwicklungsgeschichte des kaninchen-eies, 1842 – Developmental history of the rabbit ovum.
- Entwicklungsgeschichte des hunde-eies, 1845 – Developmental history of the dog ovum.
- Entwicklungsgeschichte des meerschweinchens, 1852 – Developmental history of the guinea pig.
- Entwicklungsgeschichte des Rehes, 1854 – Developmental history of the roe deer.
- Die Grosshirnwindungen des Menschen : mit Berücksichtigung ihrer Entwicklung bei dem Fötus und ihrer Anordnung bei den Affen, 1868 – The cerebral convolutions of man.
- Das Studium und die Ausübung der Medicin durch Frauen, 1872 – The study and practice of medicine by women.

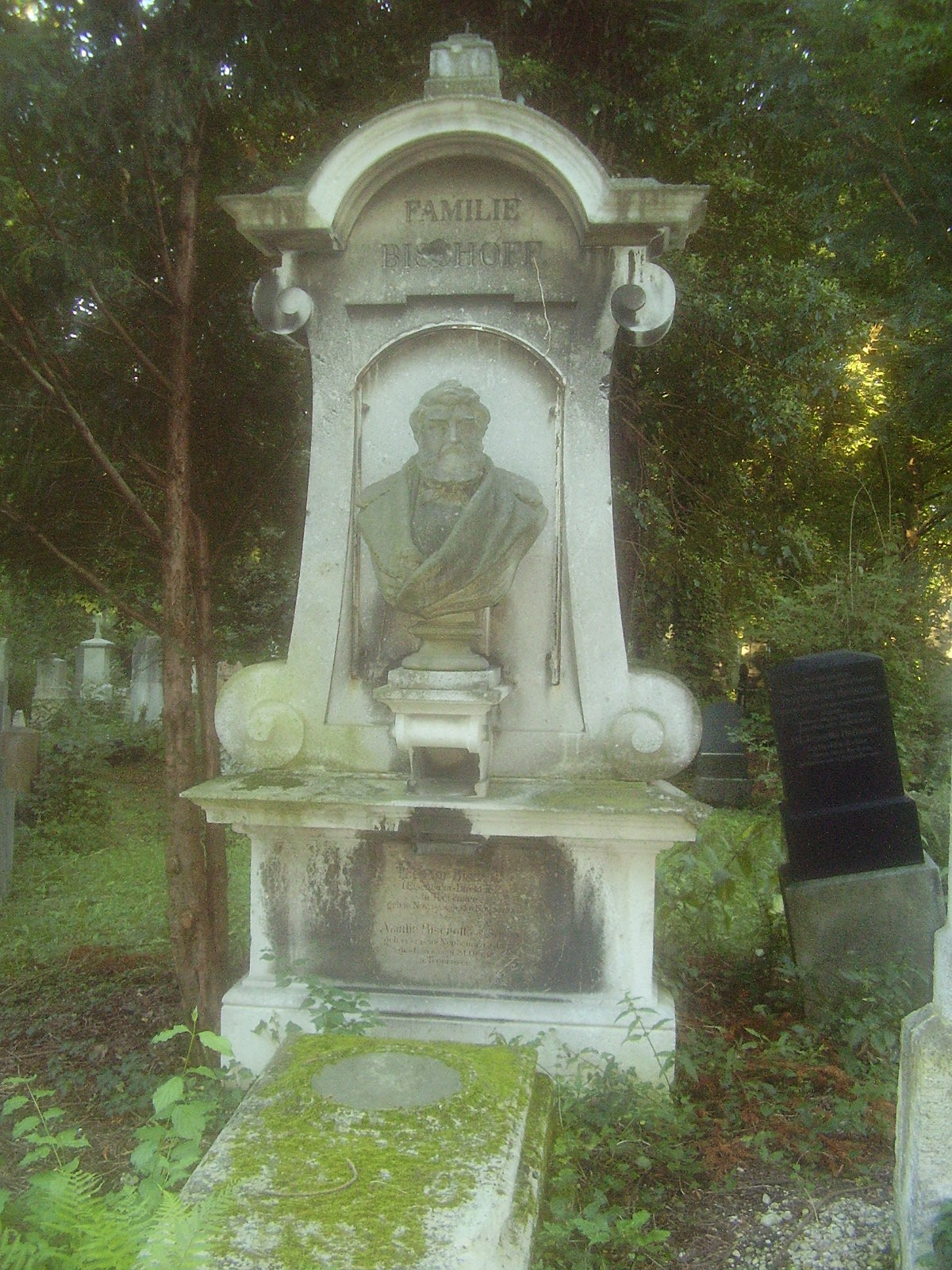
Grave of Theodor Bischoff at the Alten Südlichen Friedhof in Munich
