= List of mammals of Kaziranga National Park =

A rhinoceros grazing at Kaziranga National Park

Kaziranga National Park is a national park and UNESCO World Heritage Site in India. The park contains significant breeding populations of more than 35 mammalian species, out of which 15 are threatened according to the IUCN Red List.

The park has the world's single largest breeding population of Indian rhinoceros, with the 2006 census estimating the population to be around 1,855, around 70% of the world's wild population of 2,700.

The park contains significant stock of three other large herbivores — the Asian elephant, the wild Asian water buffalo and the subspecies eastern swamp deer (Cervus duvauceli ranjitsinghi). A census on wild Asiatic buffaloes in March 2001 revealed the presence of 1,666 buffaloes — the largest population of the species reported in this millennium, up from 677 in the 1984 census. Assam is India's most populous state with respect to Asiatic elephants (an estimated 5,500 out of a total of 10,000 wild Asiatic elephants in India live in Assam), and Kaziranga contains as many as 1,206 elephants (from the 2005 census), up from 1048 individuals (in the 2002 census). The combined Kaziranga - Karbi Anglong Elephant Reserve has as many as 1940 elephants according to the 2005 survey.

The eastern race of the swamp deer also had 468 individuals existing as noted in the 2002 census, down from 756 individuals noted in the 1984 census. Other stable populations of large herbivores include the gaur (30 individuals in 1984) and the sambar (58 in 1999). Smaller herbivores include the Indian muntjac (100 in the 1972 census), wild boar (431 in 1999), barking deer and hog deer (5045 in 1999).

The park has a large variety of primates including all free roaming primates in India with the exception of the endemic Western Ghats primates and the newly discovered Arunachal macaque. This includes the vulnerable and rare species of Bengal slow loris, Assamese macaque, capped langur, golden langur and the only ape found in India — the hoolock gibbon.

Kaziranga had a population of around 30 Bengal tigers during the 1972 census, which grew to 86 in the 2000 census. This made Kaziranga the protected area with the highest tiger density in the world (0.2 tigers /km^{2}), and Kaziranga formally became a tiger reserve in 2006.

The park is also provides habitat to sloth bear, jungle cat, fishing cat and leopard cat. Other small mammals include the rare hispid hare and Indian gray mongoose, small Indian mongoose, large Indian civet, small Indian civet, Bengal fox, golden jackal, Chinese pangolin, Indian pangolin, hog badger, Chinese ferret badger, particolored flying squirrel and bats.

Kaziranga's rivers (especially the adjoining stretch of the Brahmaputra) are home to the blind, highly endangered Ganges dolphin.

Even though the ubiquitous wild boar is present in Kaziranga, and Assam was part of the historical range of the endangered pygmy hog, the pygmy hog is no longer found in Kaziranga. The Indian Javan rhinoceros was probably also an inhabitant of Kaziranga before becoming extinct.

== List of mammals (incomplete) ==
- Indian rhinoceros (Rhinoceros unicornis)
- Wild water buffalo (Bubalus arnee)
- Indian elephant (Elephas maximus indicus)
- Royal Bengal tiger (Panthera tigris tigris)
- Indian boar (Sus scrofa cristatus)
- Himalayan mole (Euroscaptor micrura)
- Indian pangolin (Manis crassicaudata)
- Gaur (Bos gaurus)
- Barasingha (Rucervus duvaucelii)
- Sambar deer (Rusa unicolor)
- Indian muntjac (Muntiacus muntjak)
- Western hoolock gibbon (Hoolock hoolock)
- Indian hog deer (Hyelaphus porcinus)
- Capped langur (Trachypithecus pileatus)
- Rhesus macaque (Macaca mulatto)
- Assam macaque (Macaca assamensis)
- Indian leopard (Panthera pardus fusca)
- Sloth bear (Melursus ursinus)
- Indian porcupine (Hystrix indica)
- Fishing cat (Felis viverrina)
- Jungle cat (Felis chaus)
- Large Indian civet (Viverra zibetha)
- Small Indian civet (Viverricula indica)
- Indian gray mongoose (Urva edwardsii)
- Small Indian mongoose (Urva auropunctata)
- Bengal fox (Vulpes bengalensis)
- Indian jackal (Canis aureus indicus)
- Common otter (Lutra lutra)
- Chinese ferret badger (Melogale moschata)
- Hog badger (Arctonyx collaris)
- Ganges and Indus river dolphin (Platanista gangetica)
- Orange-bellied Himalayan squirrel (Dremomys lokriah)
- Asiatic black bear (Selenarctos thibetanus)
- Bat, various species
- Binturong (Arctictis binturong)
