= List of postage stamps of India (2026–2030) =

This is a list of postage stamps issued by the India Post between 2026 and 2030.

== 2026 ==
#	Issue date	Description	Image	Denomination	Ref.
1	1 February 2026	Bharatiya Tatrakshak Swarnim Jayanti		500 p	
2	1 February 2026	Uddhavdas Mehta		500 p	
3	13 February 2026	Puppets of India (set of 8 stamps)		500 p each	
4	13 February 2026	Seva Teerth Sadan		500 p	
5	16 February 2026	100 Years of Ol Chiki script by Pandit Raghunath Murmu		500 p	
6	7 March 2026	100 Years of India Security Press, Nashik		500 p	
*	Women's College of Delhi (set of 4 Stamps)				
7	25 March 2026	Gargi College, Delhi		500p	
7	25 March 2026	Miranda House, Delhi		500p	
7	25 March 2026	Kamla Nehru College, Delhi		500p	
7	25 March 2026	Lady Shri Ram College for Women, Delhi		500p	
8	2 April 2026	75 Years of Postal Training Centre, Saharanpur		500 p	
9	12 April 2026	India's Human Space Programme (AXIOM Mission) (set of 2 Stamps)		2000 p each	
10	16 April 2026	Pandit Chatur Lal		500 p	
11	25 April 2026	Centenary Year of Shri Ram College of Commerce		500 p	
12	27 April 2026	Centenary Year of Andhra University		500 p	
13	11 May 2026	Somnath Temple: 1000 Years if India's Unwavering Faith and devotion		500 p	
14	15 May 2026	Acharya Dinesh Chandra Joshi		500 p	
15	30 May 2026	200 Years of Hindi Journalism		500 p	
16	9 Jun 2026	Pradhan Manrti Surkshit Matritva Abhiyan		500 p	
*	Arunachal Pradesh Geographical Indications: Agriculture & Horticulture (set of 6 Stamps)				
17	17 July 2026	Arunachal Orange		500p	
17	17 July 2026	Khaw Tai Rice		500p	
17	17 July 2026	Singpho Phalap		500p	
17	17 July 2026	Marua Apo		500p	
17	17 July 2026	Yak churpi		500p	
17	17 July 2026	Adi kekir		500p	
*	Flora and Fauna of Arunachal Pradesh (set of 6 Stamps)				
18	17 July 2026	Fox Tail Orchid		500p	
18	17 July 2026	Great hornbill		500p	
18	17 July 2026	Red panda		500p	
18	17 July 2026	Hoolock gibbon		500p	
18	17 July 2026	Clouded leopard		500p	
18	17 July 2026	Mishmi takin		500p	
19	3 August 2026	Centenary of Satish Gujral		500 p	
*	Handlooms of India (set of 4 stamps)				
20	7 August 2026	Moirang Phee		500 p	
20	7 August 2026	Ilkal Saree		500 p	
20	7 August 2026	Chanderi Saree		500 p	
20	7 August 2026	Paithani Saree		500 p	
21	23 August 2026	Ramphal Mandal		500 p	
22	4 September 2026	Birth Centenary of Uttam Kumar		1000 p	
23	5 September 2026	Platinum Jubilee of Dinamalar Tamil News Daily		500 p	
24	12 September 2026	18th BRICS Summit New Delhi, 2026 (set of 2 Stamps)		2000 p each	
25	15 September 2026	Sant Shri Malookdas		500 p	
26	1 October 2026	100 Years of Union Public Service Commission		500 p	
27	8 October 2026	MiG-21		500 p	
28	17 October 2026	Birth Centenary of Ghanshyam Das Jain		500 p	
29	22 October 2026	Mata Sahib Hasi Devi		500 p	
30	30 October 2026	Breast Cancer Awareness (set of 2 Stamps)		2500 p each	
31	31 October 2026	Bhagwati Devi Sharma		500 p	
32	13 November 2026	Ram Bux Singh		500 p	
*	50 Years of ICMR National Institute of Malaria Research (Miniature sheet of 4 Stamps)				
33	17 November 2026	Strengthening Malaria Diagnosis through Research & Innovation		500p	
33	17 November 2026	Malaria Vector Research : Biology, Surveillance & Control		500p	
33	17 November 2026	From Community Surveys to Clinical Trialas : Evidence-Based Malaria Research		500p	
33	17 November 2026	From Genomics to AI : Edge Malaria Research		500p	
34	19 November 2026	Centenary Year of the Bihar Chamber of Commerce & Industries		500p	
