= Hoollongapar Gibbon Sanctuary =

Protected forest area in Assam, India

Hollongapar Gibbon Sanctuary
- IUCN category IV (habitat/species management area)
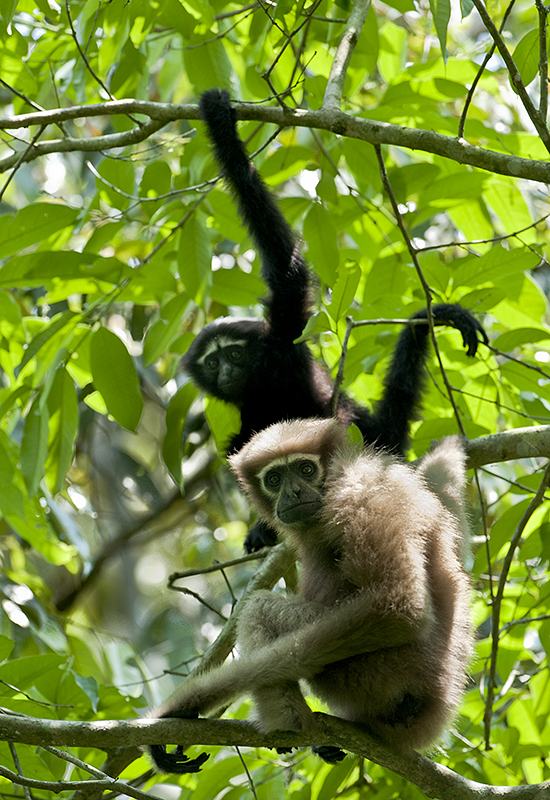
- Western hoolock gibbon (Hoolock hoolock)

- Location within Assam
- Interactive map of Hollongapar Gibbon Sanctuary
- Location: Jorhat, Assam, India
- Nearest city: Jorhat City
- Coordinates: 26.716667°N 94.383333°E
- Area: 2,098.62 ha (8.1 sq mi)
- Established: 1997; 29 years ago

The Hollongapar Gibbon Sanctuary, formerly known as the Gibbon Wildlife Sanctuary or Hollongapar Reserved Forest, is an isolated protected area of evergreen forest located in Assam, India. The sanctuary was officially constituted and renamed in 1997. Set aside initially in 1881, its forests used to extend to the foothills of the Patkai mountain range.

Since then, the forest has been fragmented and surrounded by tea gardens and small villages. In the early 1900s, artificial regeneration was used to a develop well-stocked forest, resulting in the site's rich biodiversity. The Hollongapar Gibbon Sanctuary contains India's only ape and gibbon species – the hoolock gibbons, and Northeastern India's only nocturnal primate – the Bengal slow loris.

The upper canopy of the forest is dominated by the hollong tree (Dipterocarpus retusus), while the nahar (Mesua ferrea) dominates the middle canopy. The lower canopy consists of evergreen shrubs and herbs. The habitat is threatened by illegal logging, encroachment of human settlements, and habitat fragmentation.

== History ==
Hollongapar reserved forest as a potential wildlife sanctuary was identified in late 1980s during a primate survey. The Hollongapar Gibbon Sanctuary is located in the civil district of Jorhat in Assam, India. Set aside as a "Reserve Forest" (RF) on 27 August 1881, it was named after its dominant tree species, hollong or Dipterocarpus retusus. At the time, it was considered an "integral part" of the foothill forests of the Patkai mountain range.

Although the sanctuary is currently completely surrounded by tea gardens and a few small villages, it used to connect to a large forest tract that ran to the state of Nagaland. The protected area started with 206 ha (0.80 sq mi) and then shrank in 1896 as sections were de-reserved. As tea gardens began to emerge between 1880 and 1920, and villages were established during the 1960s to rehabilitate people from Majuli and adjoining areas who had lost their lands to floods, the forest became fragmented and the reserve became isolated from the foothills.

Historically, sporadic evergreen trees covered the area along with Bojal bamboos (Pseudostachyum sp.). In 1924, artificial regeneration was introduced in an attempt to develop well-stocked, even-aged forest. These plantations along with the natural vegetation subsequently created a forest stocked with a rich variety of flora and fauna (biodiversity). During the 1900s, forest areas were added to the reserve, eventually totaling 2,098.62 ha (8.1 sq mi) by 1997. However, the sanctuary remains fragmented into five distinct segments.

On 30 July 1997, in notification no. FRS 37/97/31, the sanctuary was constituted under the civil district of Jorhat and named it the "Gibbon Sanctuary, Meleng" after the only apes found in India: the hoolock gibbons (genus Hoolock). It is the only sanctuary in India named after a primate due to its distinction for containing a dense hoolock gibbon populations. On 25 May 2004, the Assam Government correctly renamed it as the "Hollongapar Gibbon Sanctuary" through notification no. FRP 37/97/20.

== Surrounding region ==
The elephants' range of this small sanctuary extends to the Dissoi Valley Reserve Forest, Dissoi Reserve Forest, and Tiru Hill Reserve Forest, which are used as dispersal areas through tea gardens (Elephas maximus). Three extensive tea gardens that belong to the estates of Dissoi, Kothalguri, and Hollonguri span the distance between the Hollongapar Gibbon Sanctuary and the nearest forests in Assam-Nagaland border, the Dissoi Valley Reserve Forest.

The tea gardens include Katonibari, Murmurai, Chenijan, Koliapani, Meleng, Kakojan, Dihavelleoguri, Dihingapar, Kothalguri, Dissoi and Hoolonguri. Neighboring villages include Madhupur, Lakhipur, Rampur, Fesual A (the western part), Fesual B (the eastern part), Katonibari, Pukhurai, Velleoguri, Afolamukh, and Kaliagaon.

== Biota and habitat ==
The Hollongapar Gibbon Sanctuary is classified as "Assam plains alluvial semi-evergreen forests" with some wet evergreen forest patches. It receives 249 cm (98 in) of rainfall on average per year. Situated at an altitude between 100 and 120 m (330 and 390 ft), the topography gently slopes downward from southeast to northwest. The Bhogdoi River creates a waterlogged region dominated by semi-hydrophytic plants along the border of the sanctuary, helping to create three distinct habitat zones or micro-ecosystems in the park: the up-slope zone, the down-slope zone, and the flood-prone zone.

=== Fauna ===
The sanctuary has a very rich biodiversity and is home to the only apes in India, the western hoolock gibbon (Hoolock hoolock), as well as the only nocturnal primate found in the northeast Indian states, the Bengal slow loris (Nycticebus bengalensis).

As of 2023, there are 125 individuals of Hoolock Gibbon in the sanctuary.

Other primates include the stump-tailed macaque (Macaca arctoides), northern pig-tailed macaque (Macaca leonina), eastern Assamese macaque (Macaca assamensis assamensis), rhesus macaque (Macaca mulatta), and capped langur (Trachypithecus pileatus). Also found at the sanctuary are Indian elephants, leopards (Panthera pardus), jungle cats (Felis chaus), wild boar (Sus scrofa), three types of civet, four types of squirrels, among several others. At least 219 species of bird and several types of snake are known to live in the park. Apart from that 211 species of butterflies were also reported from the Wildlife Sanctuary. The tiger (Panthera tigris) is now extirpated.

=== Flora ===
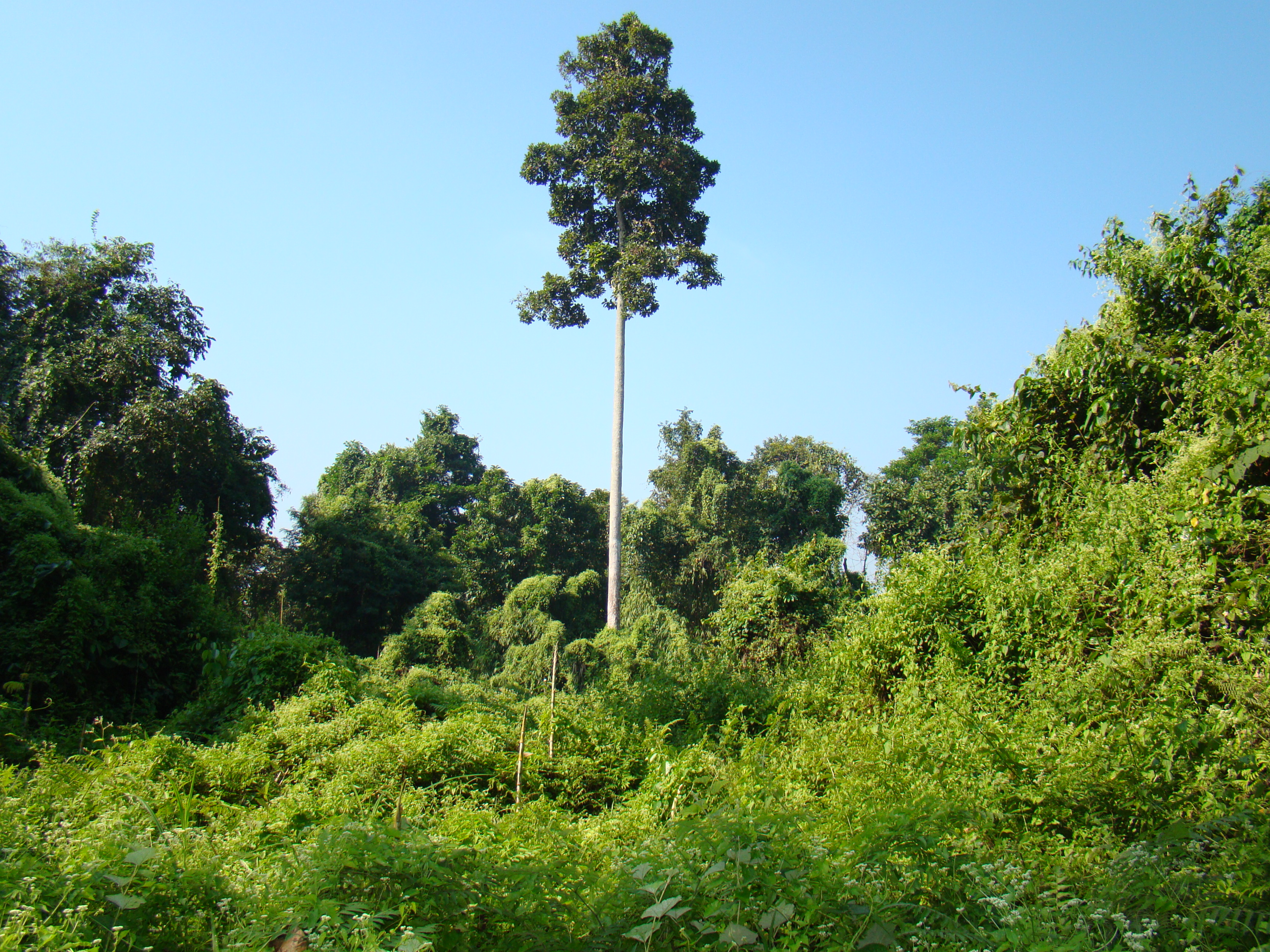
The sanctuary has a rich diversity of flora at each layer in the canopy.

Most of the vegetation within Hoollongapar Gibbon Sanctuary is evergreen in character and is composed of several canopy layers.

The upper canopy consists mostly of Dipterocarpus retusus rising 12 to 30 m (39 to 98 ft) and having straight trunks. Other species found in the top canopy include sam (Artocarpus chama), Gomari (Gmelina arborea), amoora (Amoora wallichi), sopas (Magnolia spp.), bhelu (Tetrameles nudiflora), udal (Sterculia villosa) and hingori (Castanopsis spp.).

Nahor (Mesua ferrea) dominates the middle canopy with its spreading crown, casting fairly heavy shade over a wide area. Other species that make up the middle canopy include bandordima (Prasoxylon excelsum), dhuna (Canarium resiniferum), bhomora (Terminalia belerica), ful gomari (Gmelina sp.) bonbogri (Pterospermum lanceafolium), morhal (Vatica lanceafolia), selleng (Sapium baccatum), sassi (Aquilaria malaccensis), and otenga (Dillenia indica).

A variety of evergreen shrubs and herbs make up the lower canopy and ground layers. The most common of these are dolu bamboo (Teinostachyum dullooa), bojal bamboo (Pseudostachyum polymorphum), jengu (Calamus erectus), jati bet (Calamus spp.), houka bet (Calamus spp.), tora (Alpinia allughas), kaupat (Phrynium imbricatum), and sorat (Laportea cremulata).

== Conservation ==
The isolation of the park by numerous tea gardens creates a geographic barrier for migrating animals. The growing populations of tea garden workers also threatens the habitat since many people rely on the forest for firewood, traditional medicine and food. Large quantities of leaves and grass are collected from the forests to feed cattle. During the rainy season, herbicides and pesticides from the tea gardens wash through the sanctuary.

The tea gardens are also used by elephants as a migration route to Nagaland, making them vulnerable to frequent poaching. Railway lines further divide the park, stranding a single group of gibbons in the smaller fragment. Illegal logging and the encroachment by local people employed by the tea gardens degraded the habitat quality.
