= Khungai, Jhajjar =

Khungai
- Village
- Location in Haryana, India Khungai (India)
- Country: India
- State: Haryana
- Region: North India
- District: Jhajjar

Languages
  - Official: Hindi
- Time zone: UTC+5:30 (IST)
- PIN: 124104
- ISO 3166 code: IN-HR
- Vehicle registration: HR-14
- Website: haryana.gov.in

Khungai is a village panchayat located in the Jhajjar district of the Indian state of Haryana. It is a clean, green and plastic waste free village of Haryana.

== Geography ==
Chandigarh is around 238.6 km away.

- Delhi- 45.2 km
- Jaipur- 209.5 km
- Dehradun- 215.9 km
- Dulhera, Jhajjar-4 km
- Kablana- 2 km
- Ukhalchana Kot - 5 km.

== Education ==
Shaheed Hariom Govt. High School is situated in Khungai.Many other education institutes are near Khungai, including Govt. Polytechnic, Nehru College, Prarambh, Model School, Ganga Institute and Jagan Nath University, NCR.
