= Kamala Wildlife Sanctuary =

Protected area in Arunachal Pradesh, India

- IUCN category IV (habitat/species management area)
- Location within Arunachal Pradesh Location within India
- Interactive map of Kamala Wildlife Sanctuary
- Nearest city: Daporijo
- Coordinates: 27°38′30″N 96°37′45″E
- Area: 77.607 km^{2} (29.964 sq mi)
- Established: 1 June 2015

Kamala Wildlife Sanctuary is a protected area and wildlife sanctuary located in Upper Subansiri district of the Indian state of Arunachal Pradesh. The sanctuary covers an area of 77.607 km^{2} (29.964 sq mi) and was declared as a protected area on 1 June 2015.

The protected area consists of a mixture of tropical, temperate and alpine forests. Fauna found in the sanctuary include leopard, Indian elephant, Bengal tiger, snow leopard, clouded leopard, hoolock gibbon, stump-tailed macaque, wild boar, Indian civet, capped langur, giant flying squirrel, great hornbill, and antelopes.
