= Garib Das =

Saint (1717-1778)

Sant Garib Das
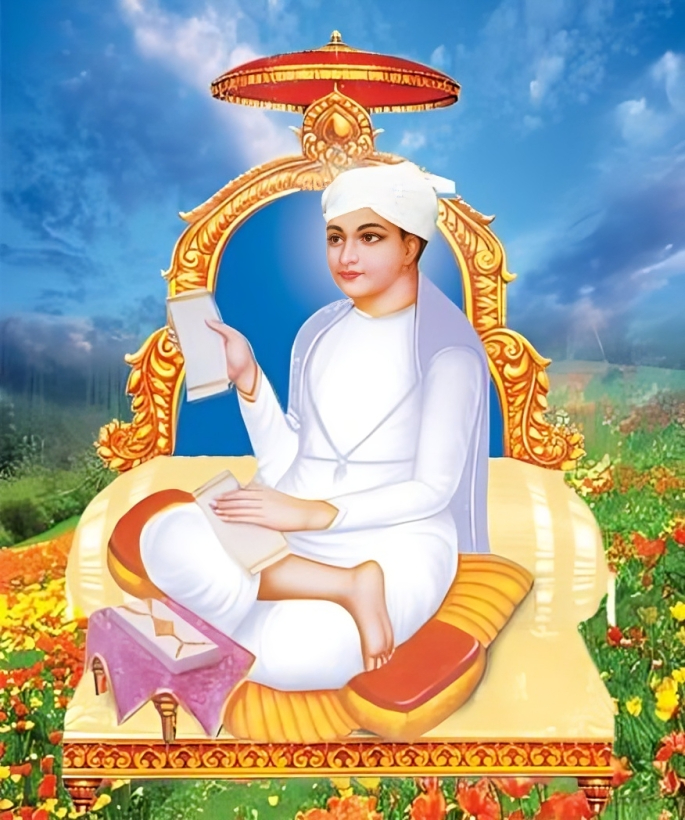
- Garib Das

Personal life
- Born: 25 April 1717 AD Chudani, Haryana, India
- Died: 25 August 1778 AD Chudani, Haryana, India
- Notable work: Shri Satguru Granth Sahib
- Other name: Satguru Dev Bandichhod Ji Acharya Shri

Religious life
- Religion: Hinduism
- Founder of: Garibdas Sampradaya
- Philosophy: Vedanta
- Sect: Vaishnavism

Religious career
- Teacher: Bhakt Kabir Das

Sant Garibdas, was an 18th-century Hindu spiritual leader, saint-poet and reformer, and the founder of Garibdasi Sampradaya.

== Early life ==
Sant Garibdas Ji born on 25 April 1717 in a Dhankhar Jat family to Bhai Balram and Mata Rani Devi, in the village Chudani, Jhajjar district, Haryana, India.

== Spiritual journey and literature ==
Garib Das worked as a cowherd in his youth and his spiritual journey started when he met Bhakt Kabir Das in a dream and received initiation from him.

Later on, he became the founder of a separate sect from Kabir Panth called Garibdasi Sampradaya.

Garibdas was a householder and initiated many people (including women) from different backgrounds till his death which led to a great expansion of the Sampradaya including the Bhuriwale tradition of Talwandi Dham (Ludhiana, Punjab).

Among his disciples, Sant Salotji became a well known name of Sampradaya.

He started composing the Sant Bani from 1767 which were written into pothis by Sant Gopaldas (of Dadu Sampradaya), now known as "Shri Satgur Granth Sahib", greatly revered by the followers of the tradition.

== Death ==
He died on 25 Aug 1778 in his native village Chhudani (Haryana) and memorial Chhatri was built in his honor.

== Gallery ==
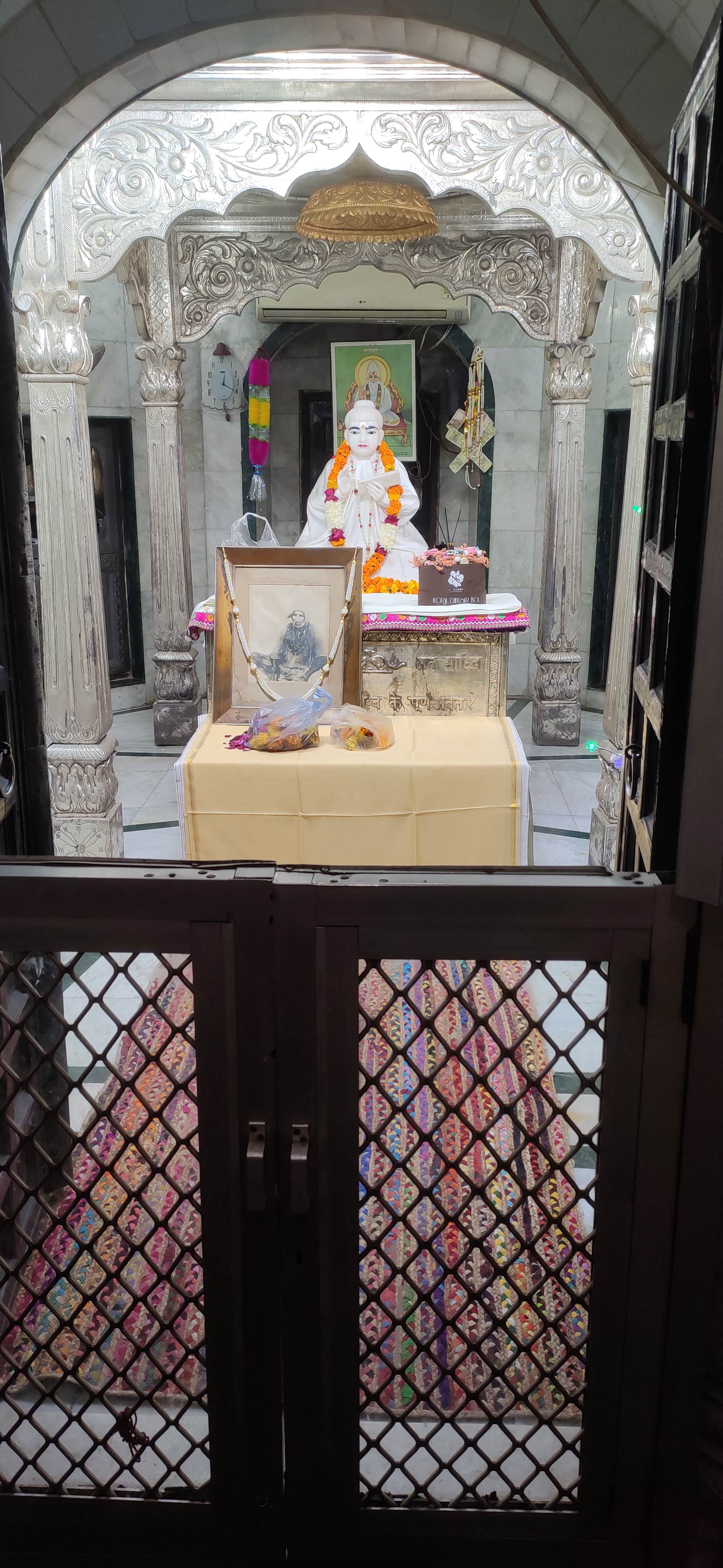
Aacharya Shri Satguru Dev Garib Das Ji Maharaj

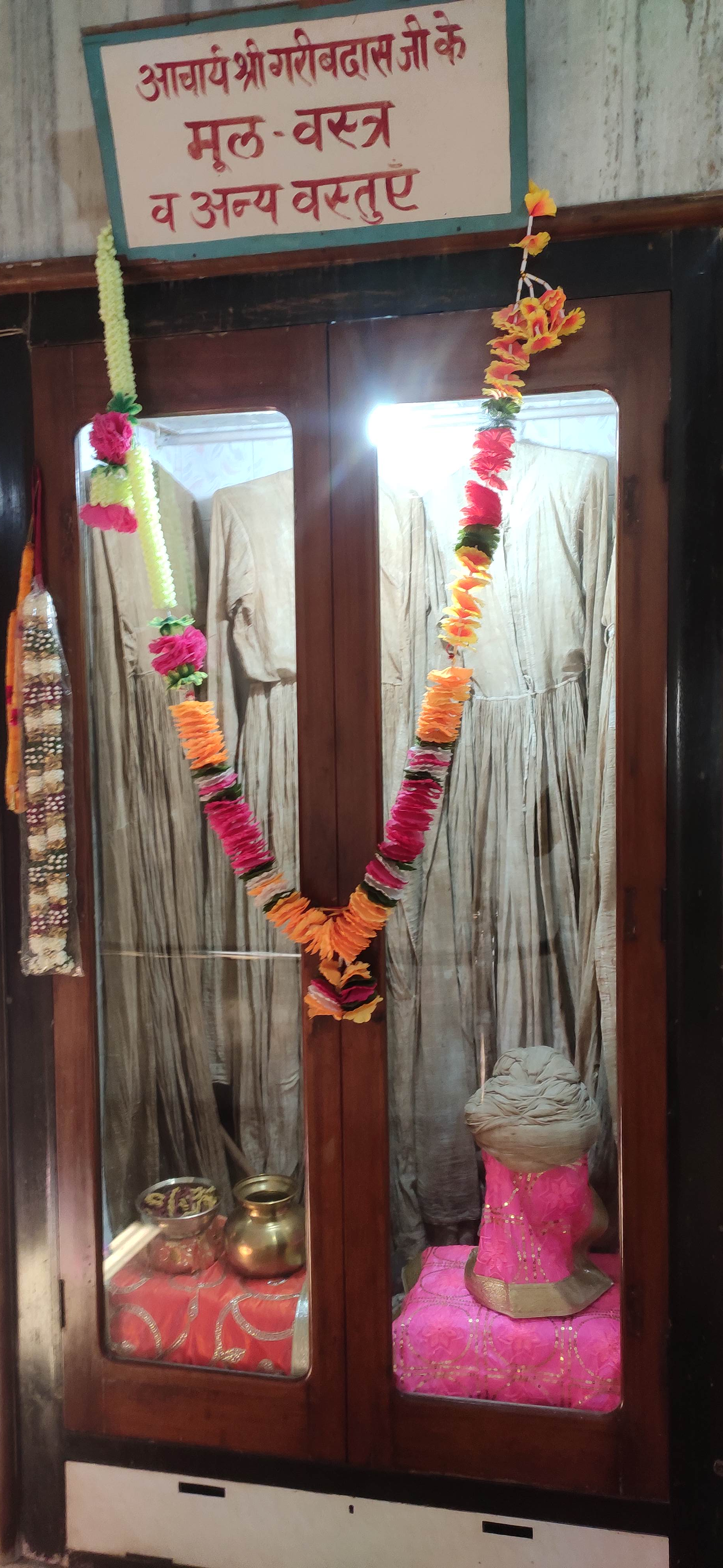
Shri Satguru Garib das Ji maharaj

== See also ==
- Kabir
- Dadu Dayal
- Maluk Das
- Dharamdas
- Bhuriwale
