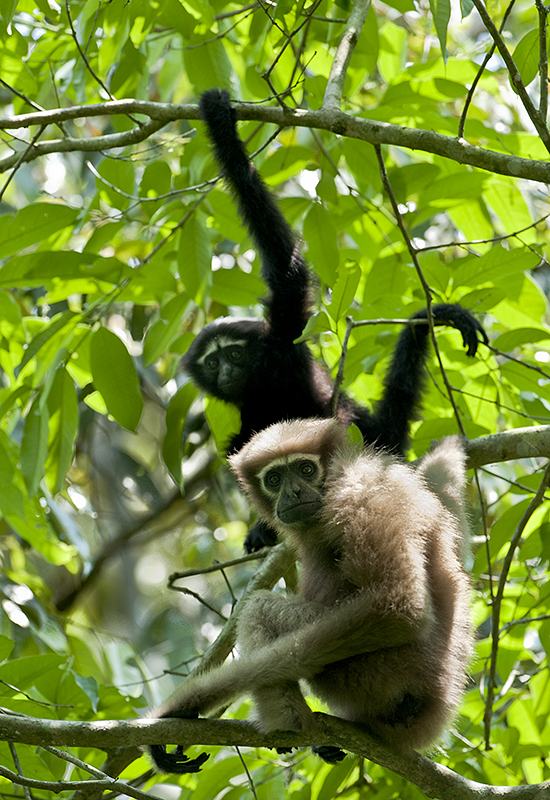
- A female (blonde fur) in the foreground, and a male (black fur) in the background

Conservation status
- Endangered (IUCN 3.1)
- CITES Appendix I

Scientific classification
- Kingdom: Animalia
- Phylum: Chordata
- Class: Mammalia
- Order: Primates
- Superfamily: Hominoidea
- Family: Hylobatidae
- Genus: Hoolock
- Species: H. hoolock

Binomial name
- Hoolock hoolock (Harlan, 1834)
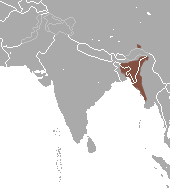
- Western hoolock gibbon range

Synonyms
- Simia hoolock protonym

= Western hoolock gibbon =

Species of ape

The western hoolock gibbon (Hoolock hoolock) is a primate from the gibbon family, Hylobatidae. The species is found in Assam, Mizoram, and Meghalaya in India, Bangladesh, and Myanmar west of the Chindwin River.

== Classification ==
Mootnick and Groves stated that hoolock gibbons do not belong in the genus Bunopithecus, and placed them in a new genus, Hoolock. This genus was argued to contain two and later three distinct species, which were previously thought to be subspecies: H. hoolock, H. leuconedys, and H. tianxing. A larger evolutionary distance was later found to exist between these three species and the white-handed gibbons than between bonobos and chimpanzees.

A new subspecies of the western hoolock gibbon has been described recently from northeastern India, which has been named the Mishmi Hills hoolock gibbon, H. h. mishmiensis.

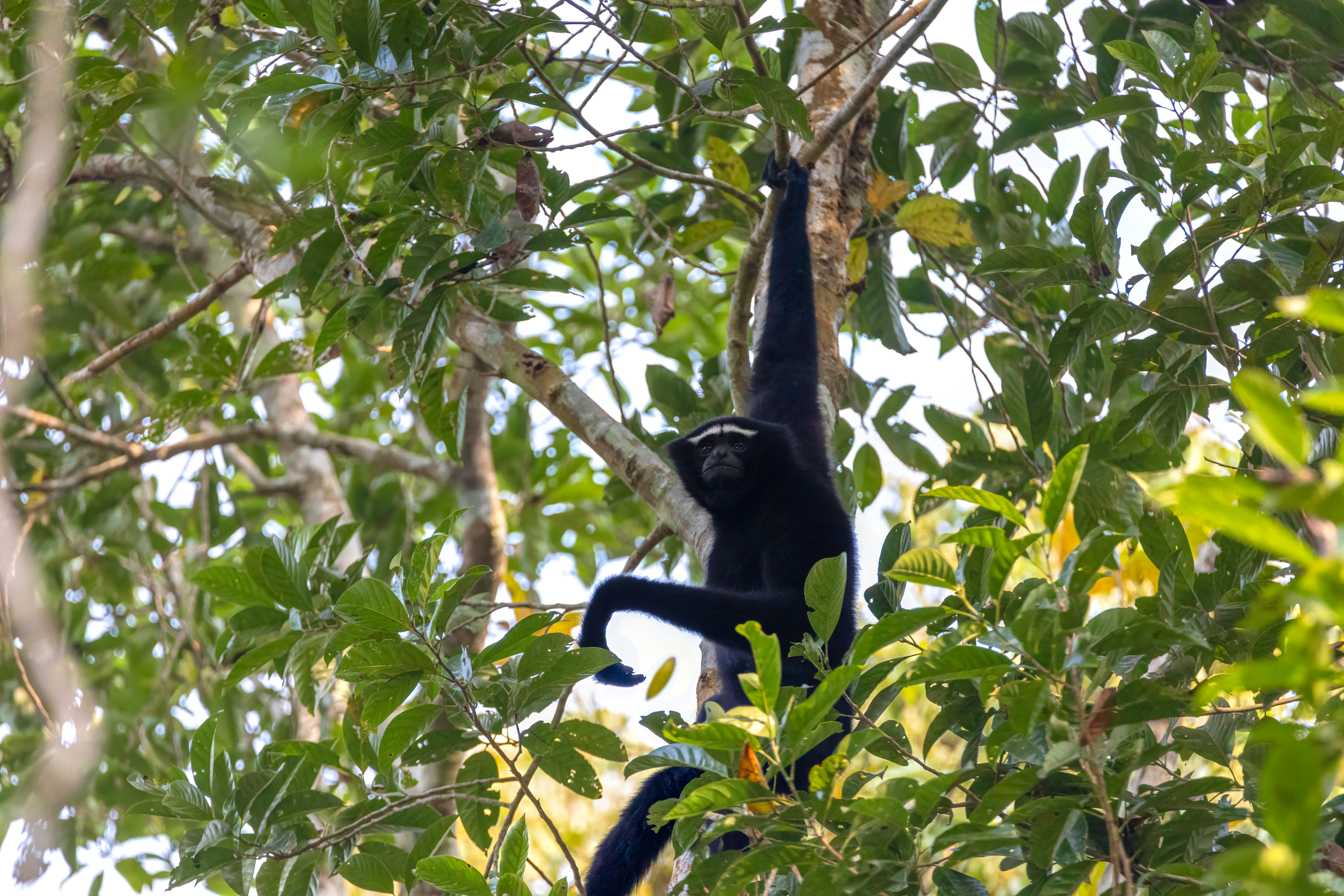
Western hoolock gibbon in canopy at Hoollongapar Gibbon Sanctuary.

== Vocalisation ==
Like other gibbons, hoolock gibbon pairs produce a loud, elaborate song, usually as a duet from the forest canopy, in which younger individuals of the family group may join. The song includes an introductory sequence, an organising sequence, and a great call sequence, with the male also contributing to the latter (unlike in some other gibbon species).

Western hoolock gibbons calling from the rainforest canopy in Dampa Tiger Reserve, Mizoram, India

== Habitat and Diet ==
In India and Bangladesh, the western hoolock gibbon is found where the canopy is contiguous, broad-leaved, wet evergreen and mixed evergreen forests, including dipterocarp forests and often in mountainous terrain. The species is an important seed disperser; its diet includes mostly ripe fruits, with some flowers, leaves, and shoots. The western hoolock gibbon also feeds on non-plant items such as silkworms, ants, and various other insect species. During the monsoon season of northeast India, insects are recorded to be this species' second preferred food item, behind Artocarpus chaplasha, a fruit bearing tree in the same genus of jack fruit.

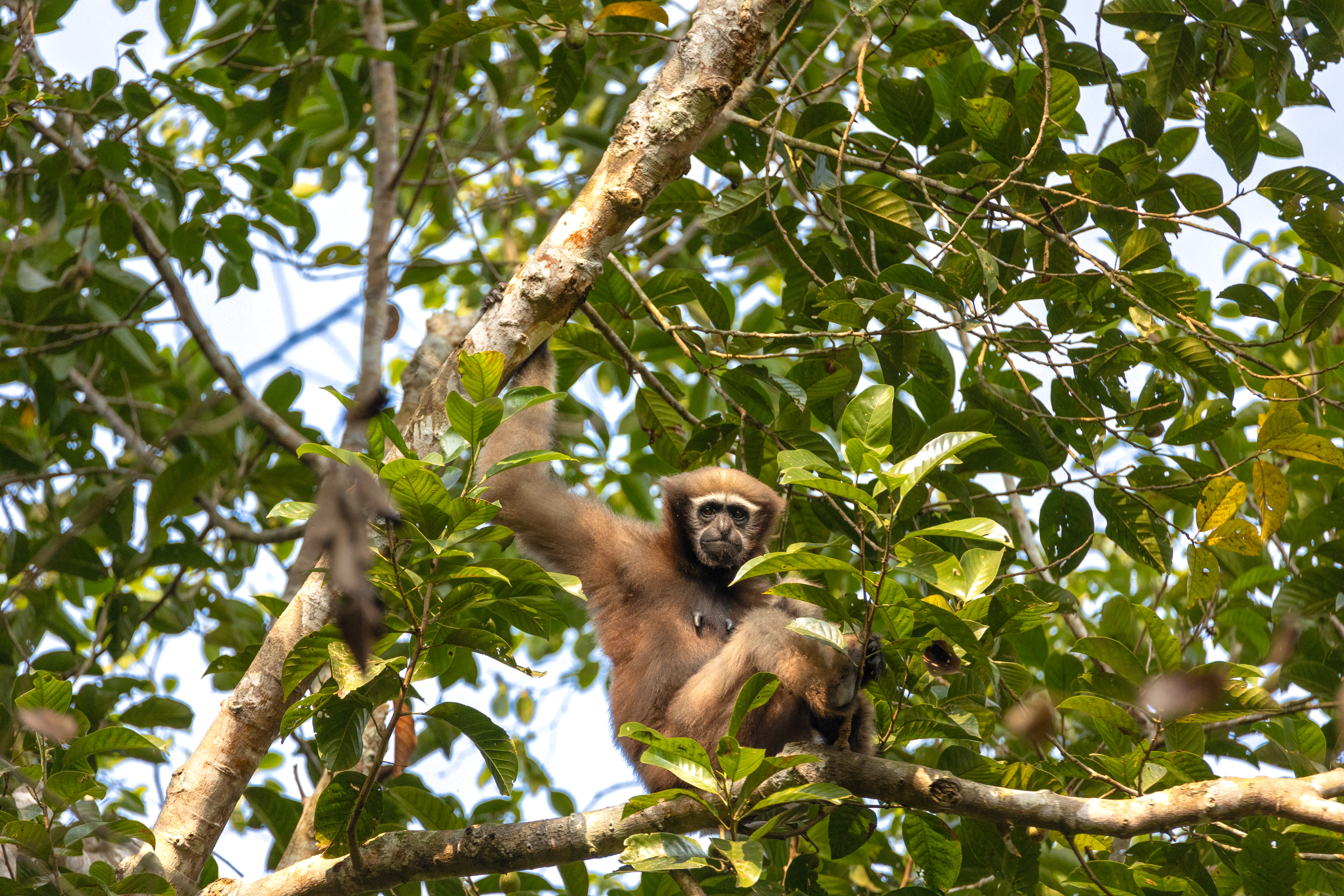
Female Western hoolock gibbon at Hoollangapar Gibbon Sanctuary.

== Conservation ==
Numerous threats exist for western hoolock gibbons in the wild, and they are now entirely dependent on human action for their survival. Threats include habitat encroachment by humans, forest clearance for tea cultivation, the practice of jhuming (slash-and-burn cultivation), hunting for food and "medicine", capture for trade, and forest degradation.

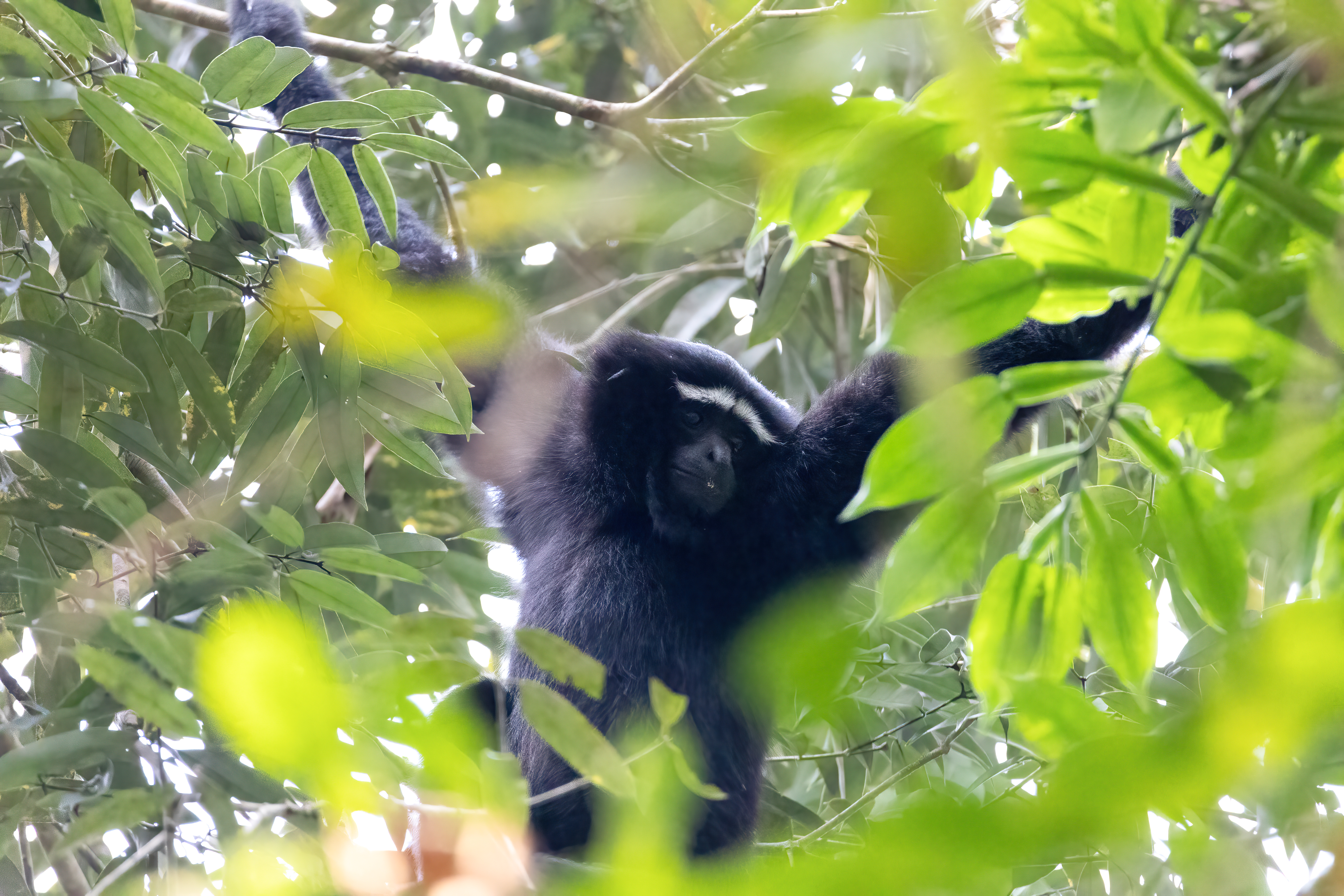
Male Western hoolock gibbon hanging from lower branches at Hoollongapar Gibbon Sanctuary.

Since the 1980s, western hoolock gibbon numbers are estimated to have dropped from more than 100,000 (Assam alone was estimated to have around 80,000 in the early 1970s) to less than 5,000 individuals (a decline of more than 90%). In 2009 it was considered to be one of the 25 most endangered primates, though it has been dropped from the later editions of the list, and is rated as endangered by the IUCN.

Multiple conservation agencies work to protect the western hoolock gibbon's habitat. A few organizations that help to fund the protection of their habitats are World Land Trust and Gibbon Conservation Alliance.

== See also ==
- Lawachara National Park
