= Chhudani =

Chhudani dham
- Village
- Location in Haryana, India Chhudani dham (India)
- Country: India
- State: Haryana
- Region: North India
- District: Jhajjar

Languages
  - Official: Hindi, Haryanvi language
- Time zone: UTC+5:30 (IST)
- PIN: 124104
- ISO 3166 code: IN-HR
- Vehicle registration: HR-14
- Website: haryana.gov.in

Chudani is a village on Jhajjar-Bahadurgarh road in the Indian state of Haryana. It belongs to Rohtak Division, located 10 kilometers West of Jhajjar, and 274 kilometers from State capital Chandigarh.

== Education ==
Post-graduate college, Kendriya Vi, Sarvodaya School and Govt. Polytechnic in Jhajjar are about 5 kilometers from this village. The Ganga Institute of Technology and Management (GITAM) has a branch in Kablana, on the Jhajjar-Bahadurgarh Road.

== Transport ==
No railway station is less than 10 kilometers away. The major Rohtak Jn Rail Way Station is 38 kilometers away.

== Nearby villages ==
The neighbouring villages are Badhani, Dulehra, Kherka Gujjar, Khungaie, Bazidpur Tappa Havel, Bajitpur, Jahangirpur, and Mandothi. The Northern border of Chudani is Sampla Tehsil, the Western border is Beri Tehsil, the Eastern is Bahadurgarh Tehsil, and the Southern is Farrukh Nagar Tehsil.

== See also ==
- Administrative divisions of Haryana
