= Bhuriwale =

Indian religious figure (1862-1947)

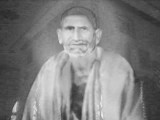
Satguru Brahm Sagar Ji Maharaj (Bhuriwale)

Satguru Brahm Sagar Ji Maharaj Bhuriwale (1862–1947) was an Indian religious figure. He was born in Rampur Dham in the Rupnagar district of Punjab and died in Village Jhaloor Dham Distt. Barnala.

== Etymology ==
He was the founder of Shri Satguru Bhuriwale (Garib Dassi) sect. He was called by the name of "Bhuriwale" Maharaj because he used to wear a brown colored shawl that is called as "Bhuri" in Punjab. It too has a Bhuri ko Bhukhar story behind it.

== Background ==
Brahm Sagar Ji Bhuriwale was the follower of Acharya Garib Das Ji of Chhudani village of Jhajjar district in Haryana. Acharya Garib Das Ji preached the divine baani (message, literally voice) in the area that is now covered by the current states of Punjab, Himachal Pradesh and Haryana. He taught the rural people of Punjab to live a life of sacrament and honesty.

In the Bhuriwale Sampradaya, Sandhia Aarti is performed to Guru Garib Das Granth, he is worshipped by all his devotees every evening. Brahm Sagar Ji had a great devotion towards the birthplace of their Guru Acharya Garib Das, which is called Shri Chhudani Dham in Haryana.

== Construction of temple at Chhudani Dham by the Founder ==
A temple was made at Chhudani village in Jhajjar district of Haryana under the guidance of Shri Satguru Brahm Sagar Ji Maharaj Bhuriwale, where clothes and other vestments of Baba Garib Das Ji are displayed in open showcases for the Darshans of followers in Shri Chhudani Dham temple. The first Handwritten manuscript is placed and maintained by the present head of Garid Das's Bhuriwale sect, Mahant Dayasagar (Meharban Sahib).

== See also ==
- Akhara
- Sampradaya
