= Kablana =

- Village
- Location in Haryana, India Kablana (India)
- Country: India
- State: Haryana
- Region: North India
- District: Jhajjar district

Languages
  - Official: Hindi
- Time zone: UTC+5:30 (IST)
- PIN: 124104
- ISO 3166 code: IN-HR
- Vehicle registration: HR-14
- Website: haryana.gov.in

Kablana is a village on Jhajjar-Bahadurgarh road in Haryana state in India. Gaje Singh Kablana in Gurgaon (Vidhan Sabha constituency) won the election as an independent candidate. The post-graduate College, Kendriya Vidyalaya, Sarvodaya School and Govt. Polytechnic in Jhajjar are about 5 km from this village. The "Ganga Institute of Technology and Management (GITAM)" has set up its branch in Kablana, on Jhajjar-Bahadurgarh Road. The village has a temple where an annual fair and a Wrestling Competition is held around festival of Holi. It belongs to Rohtak Division. It is located 10 km to the east of district headquarters Jhajjar and 274 km from state capital Chandigarh.

== Transport ==
There is railway station near to Kablana in less than 10 km in jhajjar district. However Rohtak Jn Rail Way Station is major railway station 38 km from Kablana.

== Education ==
On Jhajjar Bahadurgarh road many education institutes are there on the road, Polytechnic, Nehru College, Prarambh, Model School, Ganga Institute and Jagan Nath University, NCR on Jhajjar-Bhadurgarh-Delhi road.

== Nearby villages ==
Names of neighbouring villages are Badhani, Dulehra, Badhana, Kherka Gujjar chhudani and Khungaie. Bhadana (2 km), Bazidpur Tappa Havel (3 km), Bajitpur (4 km), Jahangirpur (5 km), Mandothi (10;km) are the nearby villages to Kablana. Kablana is surrounded by Sampla tehsil towards north, Beri tehsil towards west, Bahadurgarh tehsil towards east, Farrukh Nagar tehsil towards south. Badli tehsil towards east Jhajjar, Bahadurgarh, Rohtak and Gurgaon are the nearby cities to Kablana.
