= Skywalker hoolock gibbon =

- Hoolock tianxing (China). Male above, female below.

Conservation status
- Endangered (IUCN 3.1)
- CITES Appendix I

Scientific classification
- Kingdom: Animalia
- Phylum: Chordata
- Class: Mammalia
- Order: Primates
- Superfamily: Hominoidea
- Family: Hylobatidae
- Genus: Hoolock
- Species: H. tianxing

Binomial name
- Hoolock tianxing Fan et al., 2017
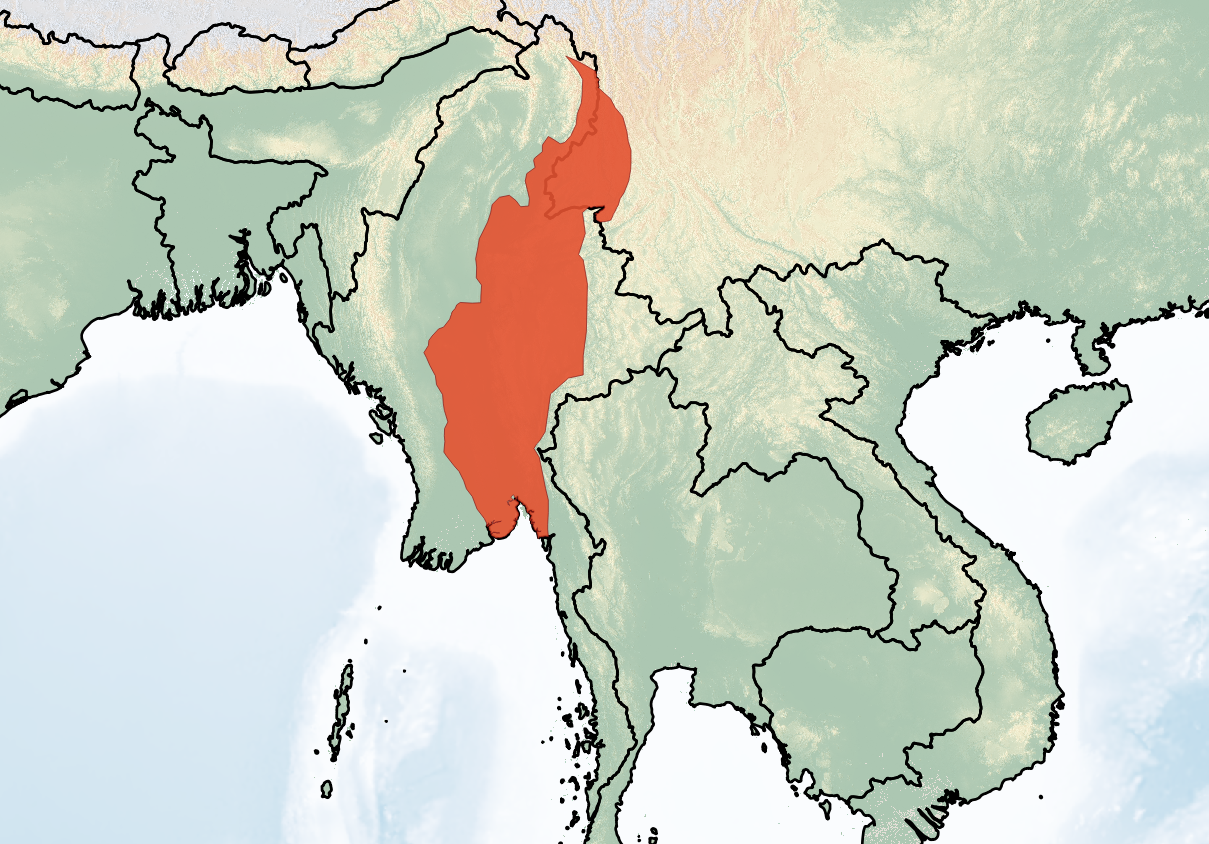
- Myanmar and surroundings in southern Asia

Species of ape

The Skywalker hoolock gibbon or Gaoligong hoolock gibbon (Hoolock tianxing) is an arboreal primate in the gibbon family Hylobatidae. It is one of three species of hoolock gibbon and was first described in January 2017 in the American Journal of Primatology. The Skywalker hoolock gibbon is one of two species of Eastern hoolocks: H. tianxing and H. leuconedys. Researchers estimate H. tianxing diverged from H. leuconedys roughly 490,000 years ago. The Eastern hoolock is vulnerable on the IUCN Red List, with a population of 310,000–370,000 individuals. Of this population, H. tianxing makes up less than 150 individuals, making the Skywalker hoolock gibbon an endangered species.

== Etymology ==
The Skywalker hoolock gibbon is named after Luke Skywalker from the Star Wars franchise, as the scientists who described it are fans of the franchise. The specific name tianxing is the Pinyin transliteration of the Chinese terms 天 (tiān) meaning "heaven" and 行 (xíng) meaning "movement". The name is a reference to brachiation, the main locomotory mode of gibbons, and derived from the text of the I Ching, an ancient Chinese book of divination.

== External morphology ==
The external morphological traits of the Skywalker hoolock gibbon differ from those of the H. leuconedys. The H. tianxing has distinguished white eyebrows, and their eyebrow streaks are thinner and separated by a larger gap than those of the H. leuconedys. They have large beards that are either all black or brown, rather than the white beards of the H. leuconedys, and they do not have pieces of white hair on their suborbital area. The H. tianxing have tufts of fur on their genital areas that are coloured either black, brown or dark grey, compared to the white tufts on the genital areas of H. leuconedys. Sexual dimorphism is present in Skywalker hoolock gibbons. In the adult male H. tianxing, their ventral pelage is coloured dark brown, and their dorsal pelage has a brownish overlay. In the adult female H. tianxing, their ventral pelage is coloured yellow/white or reddish blonde. Females also have distinctive incomplete white face rings, with sparse hairs on their lateral orbital and suborbital regions. As they get older, the colouring of their genital tufts grows fainter and lighter. Juveniles of the species can be identified by their lack of white fur on their chin or under their eyes.

== Distribution and habitat ==
The Skywalker hoolock gibbon can be found in the montane forests of eastern Myanmar and southwestern China in the Mt. Gaoligong region, located between the Salween River and the Nmai tributary of the Irrawaddy River. Hoolocks were first recorded in this region in 1917, and this is the easternmost habitat of any hoolock species. Most of the H. tianxing population can be found in unprotected forests, and they live in small patches of forest with very rough terrain. 11 solitary and 32 groups of Skywalker hoolock gibbons have been recorded in the wild, but their total population is composed of less than 150 individuals.

== Behaviour ==
Skywalker hoolock gibbons sleep in tall trees, on the thinner branches near the crown of the tree. They choose their sleeping tree for five different reasons: foraging abilities, range or resource defence abilities, thermoregulation abilities, comfort and hygiene, and antipredation reasons. They enter their sleeping trees before sunset in order to avoid nocturnal predators who are very active at that time, and once their tree has been selected, they move to it fast and directly before settling quietly for the night. They rarely spend consecutive nights sleeping in the same tree. During the cold season in Yunnan province, from November to March, the H. tianxing choose sleeping trees closer to food trees and at a lower elevation where it is warmer, and choose to sleep longer and huddle together to thermoregulate. Gibbons are known for having loud songs, specific to their species. They usually perform these songs from their sleeping trees just after dawn, and these songs last an average of 22.5 minutes.

== Breeding ==
There are four steps to the mating ritual of a Skywalker hoolock gibbon. First, the females raise their buttocks as an invitation for the male to begin mating. To accept this request, the male H. tianxing approaches the female. The male mounts the female for mating, and they have a period of rest after the mating has concluded. In the wild, it is the female H. tianxing that dominates this ritual.

== Diet ==
The Skywalker hoolock gibbon is known to consume 36 different botanic species. Their preference is always the fruit of these trees, followed by the leaves, and opting for the stems and flowers last. Female H. tianxing are reported to eat more than the males, especially during spring and autumn.

== Threats ==
The Skywalker hoolock gibbon is an endangered species, with less than 150 individuals reported in the wild. This population is fragmented between different forest areas, causing problems for further population decline due to the small population size and high likelihood of isolation. They are threatened by an abundance of illegal hunting and trading of the species, and their habitat is prone to destruction for the use of cardamon cultivation. In China, 22 hoolocks are in captivity, but only two of these are H. tianxing. No females are currently in captivity, making reproduction in captivity impossible.
