= Phrynium macrocephalum =

Scientific classification
- Kingdom: Plantae
- Clade: Tracheophytes
- Clade: Angiosperms
- Clade: Monocots
- Clade: Commelinids
- Order: Zingiberales
- Family: Marantaceae
- Genus: Phrynium
- Species: P. macrocephalum

Binomial name
- Phrynium macrocephalum K.Schum

Species of flowering plant

Phrynium macrocephalum is a plant in the family Marantaceae, whose native range is New Guinea.
