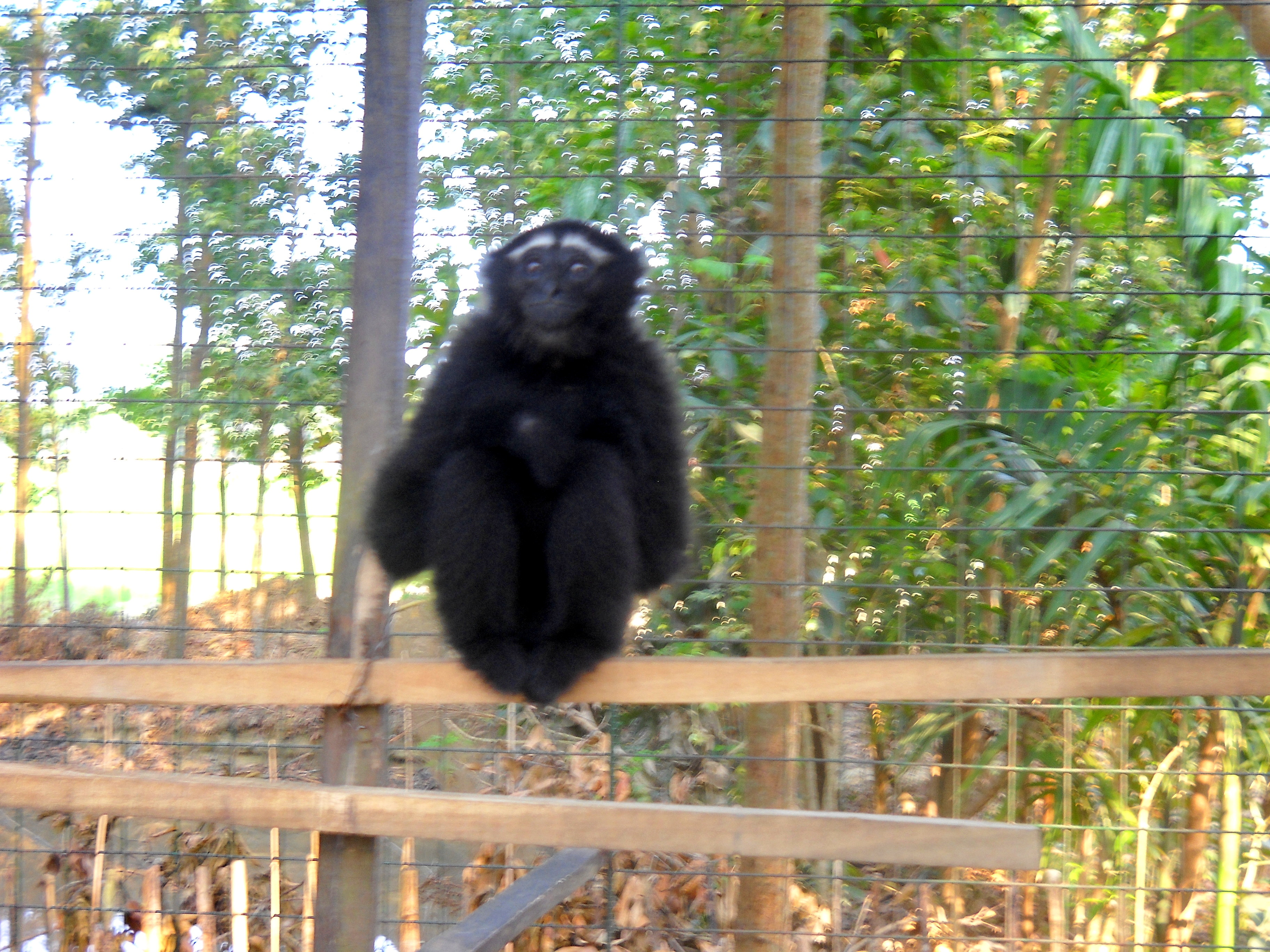

Conservation status
- Vulnerable (IUCN 3.1)
- CITES Appendix I

Scientific classification
- Kingdom: Animalia
- Phylum: Chordata
- Class: Mammalia
- Infraclass: Placentalia
- Order: Primates
- Superfamily: Hominoidea
- Family: Hylobatidae
- Genus: Hoolock
- Species: H. leuconedys

Binomial name
- Hoolock leuconedys (Groves, 1967)
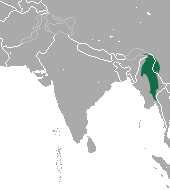
- Eastern hoolock gibbon range

= Eastern hoolock gibbon =

Species of ape

The eastern hoolock gibbon (Hoolock leuconedys) is a primate from the gibbon family, Hylobatidae. It is one of three species of hoolock gibbon. This species is found east of the Chindwin River, such as the Mahamyaing Wildlife Sanctuary, and in south west Yunnan of China. Recent study published in April, 2021, in International Journal of Primatology confirmed that this species is not found in India as it was thought to be.

== Taxonomy ==
Mootnick and Groves stated that hoolock gibbons do not belong in the genus Bunopithecus, and placed them in a new genus, Hoolock. This genus was argued to contain two distinct species which were previously thought to be subspecies: Hoolock hoolock and Hoolock leuconedys. The ranges of the two species are unclear and may overlap, and intermediates may occur.

== Habitat and ecology ==
The eastern hoolock gibbon is a forest-dwelling primate that prefers a continuous canopy, which makes them vulnerable to loss of habitat. They can be found in deciduous or evergreen forests. They also reside in partially deciduous hill forests as well as broadleaf pine forests, and can be found as high as 2,700 m in elevation in northeastern Myanmar. The eastern hoolock gibbon has been found in tropical environments that experience monsoon rains and have cool, dry winters. and lowland tropical environments.

The eastern hoolock gibbon is an omnivorous animal, with fruits making up the majority of its diet at about 65%, with 60% of the fruits being figs. They also eat lichens, invertebrates, bird eggs, plant parts (buds, shoots, leaves, flowers), and insects. The majority of what they eat depends on their location and the density of the available resources, but fruits always show to be their most dominant food type. Gibbon groups sleep in trees that are close to each other, focusing on the tallest canopy trees, and tend to choose areas located either on hilltops or slopes. They also sleep in a fetal position with their arms hugging their knees into their chests. Gibbons are more active in the summer, awaking earlier in the day than in the winter, and socialize more with each other while being awake for about 8–10 hours a day, sleeping shortly before dusk arrives. They have food competition with Malayan giant squirrels, so chase them away from their food resources, but are subject to attacks by thrushes, magpies, and drongos, with the drongos being the most aggressive over food.

== Threats ==
The primary threat facing this species is habitat loss and degradation due to human activities, such as logging, mining, construction, and agriculture. They have also suffered the effects of being harvested for meat by ethnic groups in India and for use in folk medicine. In Myanmar, the major threat stems from the effects of commercial logging, and are subject to competition with humans for resources within the Hukaung Valley Tiger Reserve. Infant gibbons have been known to have been preyed upon by monitor lizards (Varanus) and mountain hawk-eagles (Nisaetus nipalensis), and larger gibbons have been killed by domestic dogs from local villages while crossing gaps between forests. They are also subject to predation by leopards, pythons, and vultures.

== Conservation ==
So far, China has created the Gaoligongshan and Tongbiguan National Nature Reserves that currently house small populations of the eastern hoolock gibbon, and the Mahamyaing Sanctuary in Myanmar also acts as a gibbon shelter, as does the Hukaung Valley Tiger Reserve, which has noted that some gibbons live within its boundaries. Within Arunachal Pradesh, the Forest Department has been working with the Wildlife Trust of India to transfer gibbon groups to the Mehao Wildlife Sanctuary, and the Biological Park of Itanagar has created a program to captive-breed this species and release them into the wild with the collaboration of the Central Zoo Authority. India has also made killing or capturing the eastern hoolock gibbon illegal, but has few resources to be able to enforce the laws, thus is more focused on protecting larger mammals.
