= Phrynium =

Scientific classification
- Kingdom: Plantae
- Clade: Tracheophytes
- Clade: Angiosperms
- Clade: Monocots
- Clade: Commelinids
- Order: Zingiberales
- Family: Marantaceae
- Genus: Phrynium; Willd.

Synonyms
- Cominsia Hemsl.; Monophrynium K.Schum. in H.G.A.Engler (ed.); Phacelophrynium K.Schum. in H.G.A.Engler (ed.)

Genus of flowering plants

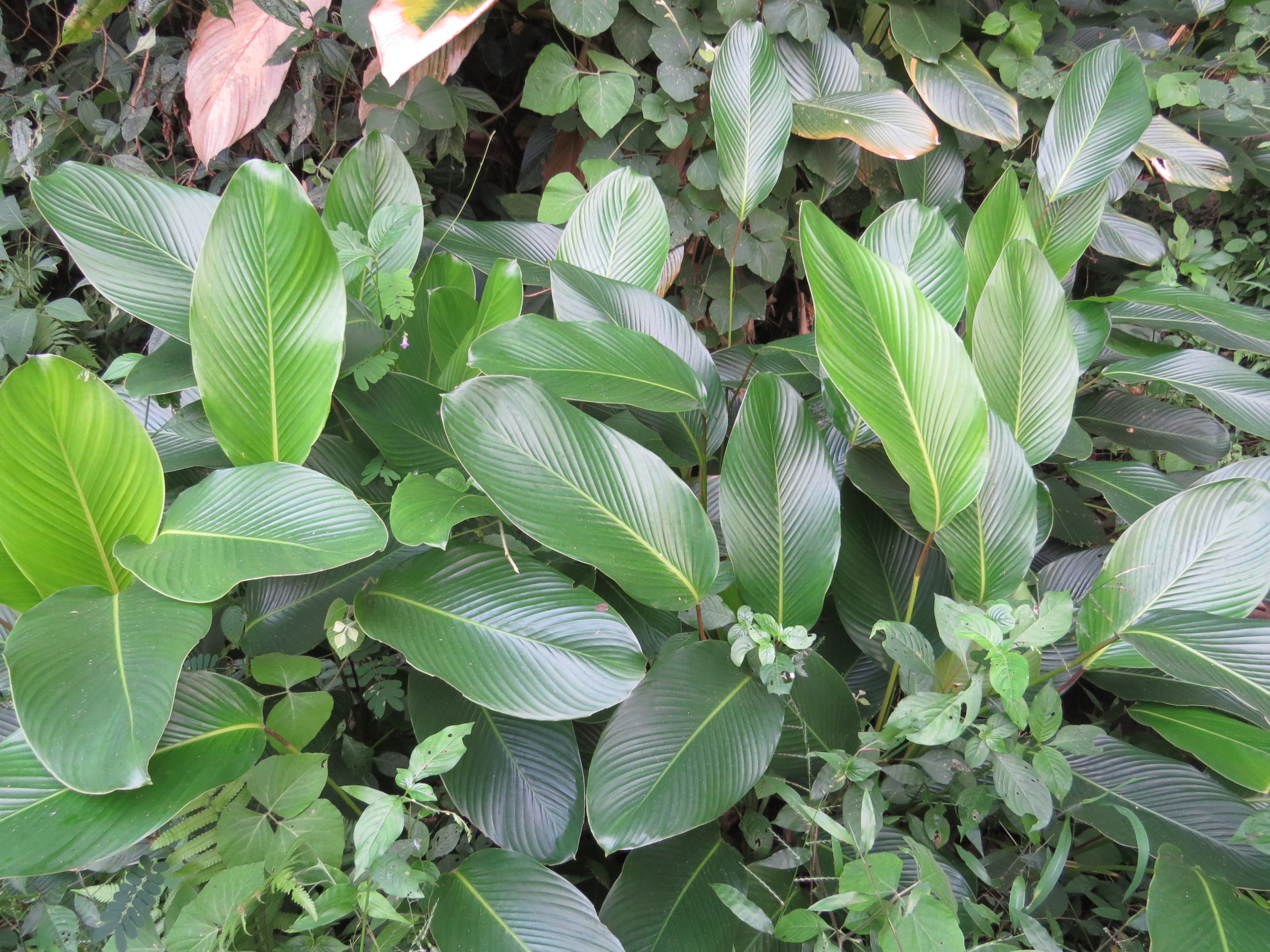

Phrynium is a genus of flowering plants native to China, India, Southeast Asia, New Guinea and Melanesia. It was described as a genus in 1797.

== Species ==
The Kew World Checklist includes:

- Phrynium aurantium (Clausager & Borchs.) Suksathan & Borchs. - Borneo
- Phrynium bracteosum (Warb. ex K.Schum.) Suksathan & Borchs - Borneo, Philippines
- Phrynium fasciculatum (C.Presl) Horan. - Philippines, Maluku
- Phrynium fissifolium Ridl. - Borneo
- Phrynium giganteum Scheff. - Maluku, New Guinea, Bismarcks, Solomons, Vanuatu
- Phrynium gracile K.Schum. in K.M.Schumann & C.A.G.Lauterbach - Bismarcks
- Phrynium grandibracteatum Clausager & Borchs - Borneo
- Phrynium hainanense T.L.Wu & S.J.Chen - Thailand, Vietnam, southern China
- Phrynium hirtum Ridl. - Thailand, Borneo, Sumatra, Malaysia
- Phrynium houtteanum K.Koch - Java
- Phrynium imbricatum Roxb. - India, Bangladesh, Burma, Thailand, Vietnam, China
- Phrynium interruptum (K.Schum.) Suksathan & Borchs. - Philippines, Maluku
- Phrynium kaniense Loes. & G.M.Schulze - New Guinea
- Phrynium laxum (Clausager & Borchs.) Suksathan & Borchs. - Borneo
- Phrynium longispicum (K.Schum.) Suksathan & Borchs. - Sulawesi
- Phrynium macrocephalum K.Schum. in K.M.Schumann & U.M.Hollrung - New Guinea ("Kaiser Wilhelm's Land")
- Phrynium magnificum Suksathan & Borchs. - New Guinea
- Phrynium maximum Blume - Java, Sumatra, Malaysia, Borneo
- Phrynium minor (Valeton) Suksathan & Borchs. - New Guinea
- Phrynium minutiflorum Suksathan & Borchs. - Philippines
- Phrynium nicobaricum Didr. - Nicobar Islands
- Phrynium obscurum Teijsm. & Binn. - Thailand, Malaysia, Sumatra
- Phrynium parvum (Ridl.) Holttum - Peninsular Malaysia
- Phrynium pedunculatum Warb. ex K.Schum. - New Guinea
- Phrynium pedunculiferum D.Fang - China, Thailand, Vietnam
- Phrynium pubinerve Blume - widespread from India to China to New Guinea
- Phrynium robinsonii (Valeton) Suksathan & Borchs. - Sulawesi, Maluku
- Phrynium rubrum (Valeton) Suksathan & Borchs. - Maluku
- Phrynium sapiense (Clausager, Mood & Borchs.) Suksathan & Borchs. - Sabah
- Phrynium schlechteri Loes. & G.M.Schulze - New Guinea
- Phrynium simplex (Elmer) Suksathan & Borchs. - Luzon
- Phrynium stenophyllum Clausager & Borchs. - Borneo
- Phrynium tonkinense Gagnep. - Vietnam, Yunnan
- Phrynium tristachyum Ridl. - Peninsular Malaysia
- Phrynium venustum I.M.Turner - Peninsular Malaysia
- Phrynium villosulum Miq. - Borneo, Malaysia, Sumatra
- Phrynium whitei (Ridl.) Suksathan & Borchs. - New Guinea
