= Gibbon Conservation Center =

Animal conservation and education center located near Santa Clarita, California

- Interactive map of Gibbon Conservation Center
- 34°27′55″N 118°28′11″W
- Location: 19100 Esguerra Road; Santa Clarita, California 91390

The Gibbon Conservation Center (GCC) is an animal conservation and education center located near Santa Clarita, California. It is dedicated exclusively to the small Asian ape, the gibbon, and houses the most varied group of gibbons in the Western Hemisphere, including representatives of all 4 genera and 5 of the existing 19 species. The average population of the GCC is approximately 40 gibbons, housed in family groups.

== Overview ==
The GCC was founded in 1976 in Saugus by Alan Richard Mootnick, a native of Encino, California who became a leading authority on gibbons despite having no formal training in the biological sciences. Mootnick acquired his first gibbon (a former pet named Spanky) in 1976, and in 1980 he used money from his home repair and painting business to buy the 10-acre site where the center now operates.

The GCC is a registered 501c3 non-profit tax-exempt organization, supported by donations, a small staff and many volunteers. The GCC is open to the public for tours on weekends and by special arrangement. Students and anthropology/biology researchers regularly conduct projects and observations at the Gibbon Conservation Center.

The goals of the GCC include: to help ensure the conservation and survival of all gibbon species in the wild and in captivity; to provide a captive haven for all gibbon species as a complement to protecting them in the wild; to educate the public and add to the knowledge on gibbons for the scientific community, rehabilitation centers, and zoos and to support ongoing field conservation projects.

The current director of the Gibbon Conservation Center is Gabriella (Gabi) Skollar, who worked with the founder, Alan Mootnick, for several years until his death.
