= Acharya Dinesh Chandra Joshi =

Sanskrit scholar, Vedic scholar and spiritual teacher (1926–2018)

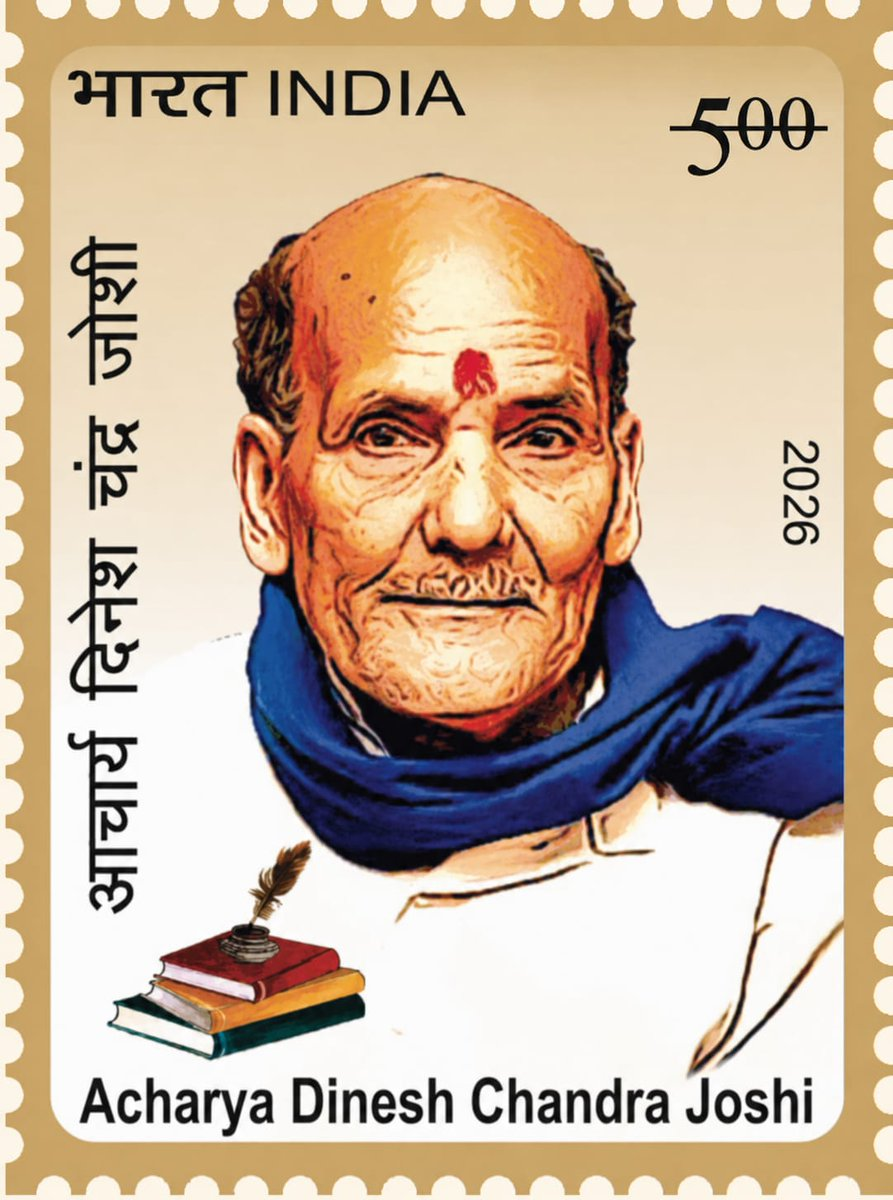
- Born: 11 April 1926; Matela, Nainital, Uttarakhand, British India
- Died: 18 March 2018 (aged 91)

Acharya Dinesh Chandra Joshi (11 April 1926 – 18 March 2018) was an Indian Sanskrit scholar, Vedic scholar and spiritual teacher from Uttarakhand. He was associated with the promotion of Sanskrit language, Indian philosophical traditions and traditional knowledge systems. He founded the organisation Swastivachanam in 2010, which works in the fields of Sanskrit journalism, Ayurveda, Yoga, Vastu Shastra and Indology. He also advocated for the promotion of Sanskrit in Uttarakhand, where the language was accorded the status of a second official language in 2010.

== Early life and education ==
Dinesh Chandra Joshi was born to father Acharya Premballabh Joshi and mother Revati Joshi, on 11 April 1926 in Matela village in the Nainital district of present-day Uttarakhand, India. His father was Vedic scholar. He received his early education at home under the guidance of his father and grandfather, in an environment influenced by traditional Sanskrit learning and Vedic studies.

He subsequently pursued studies at several traditional centres of learning in India. His areas of study included the Shukla Yajurveda and Advaita Vedanta.

== Work and contributions ==
Joshi devoted much of his life to the study and propagation of Sanskrit and Indian philosophical traditions. He travelled extensively across India and Nepal, teaching and disseminating the philosophical teachings associated with Adi Shankaracharya.

His activities also included the promotion of environmental conservation and the preservation of the cultural heritage of the Himalayan region. He advocated the recognition of Sanskrit as an important part of India's intellectual and cultural traditions.

=== Promotion of Sanskrit in Uttarakhand ===
Joshi was associated with efforts to promote Sanskrit and secure its recognition in Uttarakhand. In 2010, Sanskrit was accorded the status of the second official language of the state. His contribution to the movement was subsequently acknowledged by the Ministry of Culture during the centenary commemoration held in 2026.

On 24 August 2010, Joshi established 'Swastivachanam', an organisation dedicated to the promotion and preservation of Sanskrit and traditional Indian knowledge systems. Its activities encompass five principal areas: Sanskrit journalism, Ayurveda, Yoga, Vastu Shastra and Indology, which Joshi collectively described as the Pancha Mahaprasthanas. Through these areas, the organisation seeks to promote Sanskrit and preserve India's traditional intellectual and cultural heritage.

=== Bhagavati Temple and Meditation Centre ===
During the 1990s, Joshi established the Bhagavati Temple and Meditation Centre at Matela, his birthplace. The centre became associated with spiritual activities and meditation.

== Death and legacy ==
Commemorative Postage Stamp Release on Acharya Dinesh Chandra Joshi

Dinesh Chandra Joshi died on 18 March 2018.

His birth centenary was observed from 11 April 2026 to 11 April 2027 through academic seminars, cultural programmes and commemorative events organised across India. The Ministry of Culture, in collaboration with the Sahitya Akademi and Sanskrit universities, organised a national seminar on his contributions to Sanskrit and Indian culture on 15 May 2026 at Shri Lal Bahadur Shastri National Sanskrit University in New Delhi.

On 15 May 2026, the Department of Posts, Government of India, issued a commemorative postage stamp honouring Dinesh Chandra Joshi on the occasion of his birth centenary. The stamp had a denomination of ₹5 and was printed using the wet offset process. A total of 202,800 stamps were printed by the Security Printing Press, Hyderabad.
