= Phrynium imbricatum =

Scientific classification
- Kingdom: Plantae
- Clade: Tracheophytes
- Clade: Angiosperms
- Clade: Monocots
- Clade: Commelinids
- Order: Zingiberales
- Family: Marantaceae
- Genus: Phrynium
- Species: P. imbricatum

Binomial name
- Phrynium imbricatum Roxb., 1820

Synonyms
- Phyllodes imbricata (Roxb.) Kuntze; Phrynium oliganthum Merr. Phrynium dispermum Gagnep. Maranta imbricata (Roxb.) A.Dietr.

Species of flowering plant

Phrynium imbricatum is a species of plant in the family Marantaceae. It can be found from India through to most of Indo-China; no subspecies are listed in the Catalogue of Life.
