= Maluk Das =

Indian saint

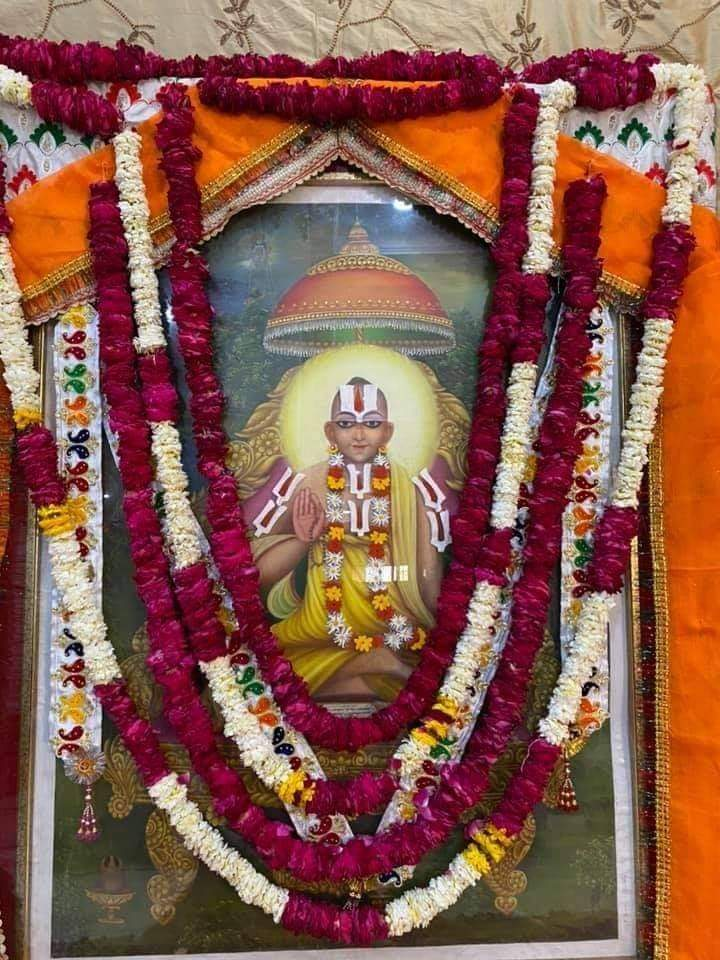

Personal life
- Region: North India
- Notable work(s): Maluk Shatak, Maluk Parichai, Gyan Bodh

Religious life
- Religion: Hinduism
- Lineage: Galtaji
- Sect: Ramanandi Sampradaya
- Movement: Bhakti movement

Religious career
- Predecessor: Muraridas

Maluk Das (Hindi:मलुक दास, 1574) was a devotional poet-saint from Prayagraj (Allahabad), India, a religious poet of the Bhakti Movement. These Compositions are most famous: Ratna khan, Maluk Shatak and Gyan Bodh.

== Works ==
According to Dr. Umesh Chand Verma only 9 authentic works are available of Maluk Das which includes Gyan Bodh, Sukha Sagar, Gyan Parochi, Vibhav Vibhuti, Dhruv Charit, Dhuja Charit, Barah Khadi, Maluk Parichai and Maluk Shatak.

== Maluk Shatak ==
Maluk Shatak is one of his major composition of Maluk Das, consisting of 101 Couplet, one of his famous couplet is:

अजगर करै न चाकरी पक्षी करै न काम ।
'दास मलूका' कहत है सब के दाता राम ॥76॥

This translates to: The python doesn’t plow, the bird doesn’t work. Maluka Dasa says, "Rama is the provider for all." In his same work he talks about the four vaishnavite sects:

जानहु श्री सनकादि अरु ब्रह्मा रुद्र उदार ।
कह 'मलूक' वैदिक यही सम्प्रदाय हैं चार ॥95॥
रामानन्दाचार्य जी श्री के शुभ आचार्य ।
कह 'मलूक' सनकादि के हैं (श्री) निम्बार्काचार्य ॥96॥
कह 'मलूक' श्री ब्रह्म के हैं श्री मध्वाचार्य ।
विष्णु स्वामि श्री रुद्र के सम्प्रदाय-आचार्य ॥97॥

This translates to: Know that Sri, Sanaka Brahma and Rudra traditions are generous. "Maluka" says, these are the four Vedic traditions. Ramanandacharya is the venerable teacher of Sri Sampradaya, "Maluka" says, Nimbarkacharya belongs to Sri Sanakadi tradition. "Maluka" says, Sri Madhavacharya belongs from the lineage of Brahma and Vishnu Swami belongs to Sri Rudra's tradition.

== Life ==
Maluk Das was born in Kada, near Prayag in 1574. Das Themes of his songs include social religious tolerance, goodwill among men, equality and the oneness of God. In this way he resembles other singers of the Bhakti movement including Kabir and Guru Nanak.

== Teachings and legacy ==
His three popular creations are Ratan Khan, Maluk Shatak and Gyan Bodh.

== Sources ==
- Karine Schomer, W. H. McLeod (eds), The Sants: Studies in a Devotional Tradition of India, Motilal Banarsidass, 1987 ISBN 8120802772.
- T. Phillips, The Missionary's Vade Mecum, Or, A Condensed Account of the Religious Literature, Sects, Schools, and Customs of the Hindus in the North West of India, J. Thomas, 1847.
- George Small, A Handbook of Sanskṛit Literature: with Appendices Descriptive of the Mythology, Castes, and Religious Sects of the Hindus, 1866.
- Rajmani Tigunait, From Death to Birth: Understanding Karma and Reincarnation, Himalayan Institute Press, 1997 ISBN 0893891479.
- The Concept of God in Maluka's Poetry
