= Dulhera =

- Village
- Location in Haryana, India Dulhera (India)
- Country: India
- State: Haryana
- Region: North India
- District: jaatland Jhajjar

Languages
  - Official: Haryanvi, Haryanvi
- Time zone: UTC+5:30 (IST)
- PIN: 124507
- ISO 3166 code: IN-HR
- Vehicle registration: HR-13
- Website: haryana.gov.in

Dulhera is a village on State Highway 22, the Jhajjar–Bahadurgarh road, 13 km from Jhajjar and 15 km from Bahadurgarh. Kablana is a nearby village. Jagan Nath University, NCR is a university between Kablana and Dulhera villages. Dulhera's pincode is 124507.

In Dulhera there is a temple named Baba Ashanand Temple (Aashiya), an old temple of Lord Shiva called Shivala and a temple called Ubbala Dham on Dharshyan Pana. On Bupania Road outside Dulhera village there is the Baba Haridas Temple (Sedhda).
