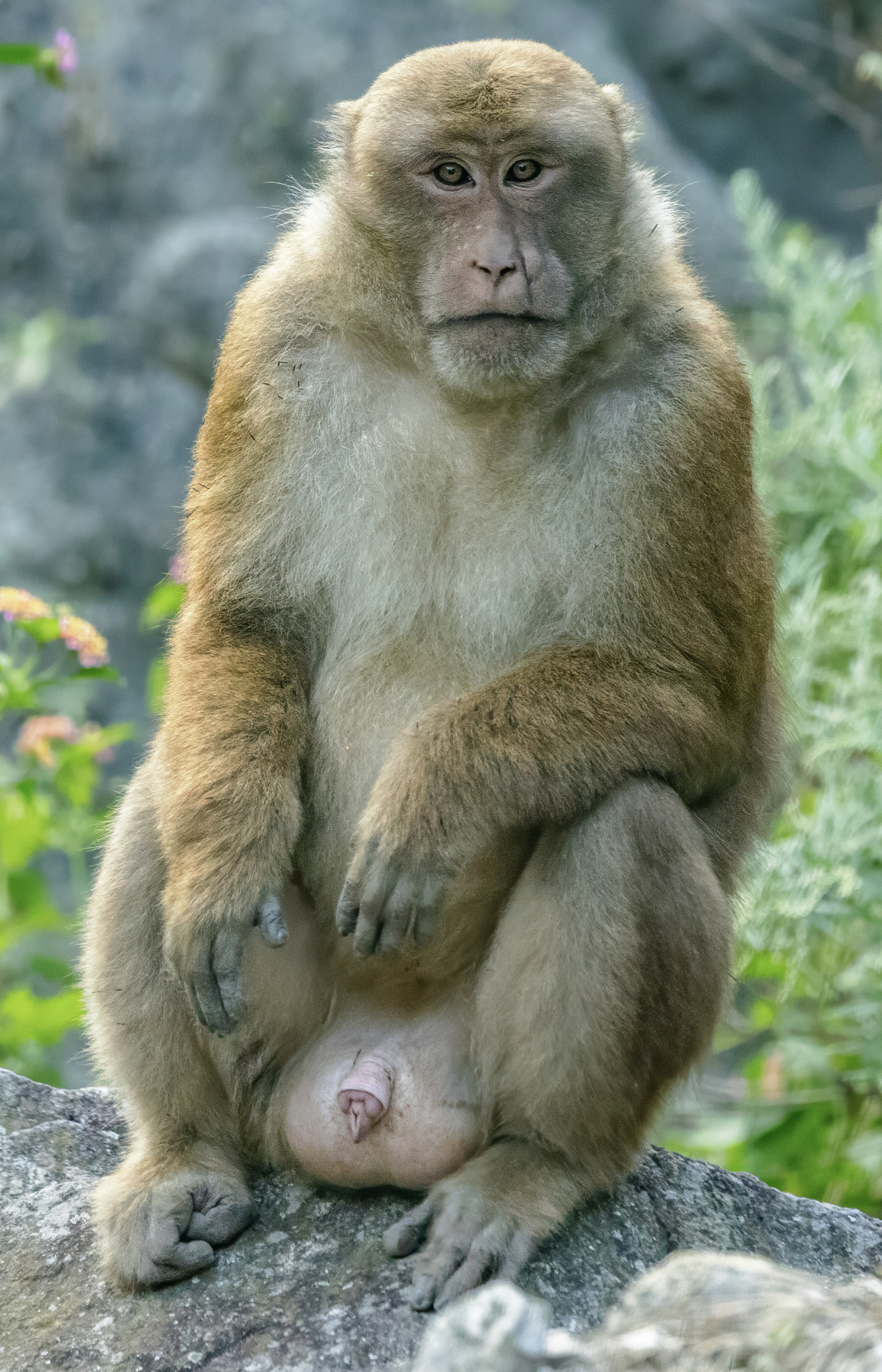

Conservation status
- Near Threatened (IUCN 3.1)

Scientific classification
- Kingdom: Animalia
- Phylum: Chordata
- Class: Mammalia
- Infraclass: Placentalia
- Order: Primates
- Family: Cercopithecidae
- Genus: Macaca
- Species: M. assamensis

Binomial name
- Macaca assamensis McClelland, 1840
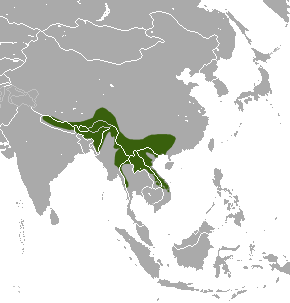
- Assam macaque range

= Assam macaque =

Species of Old World monkey

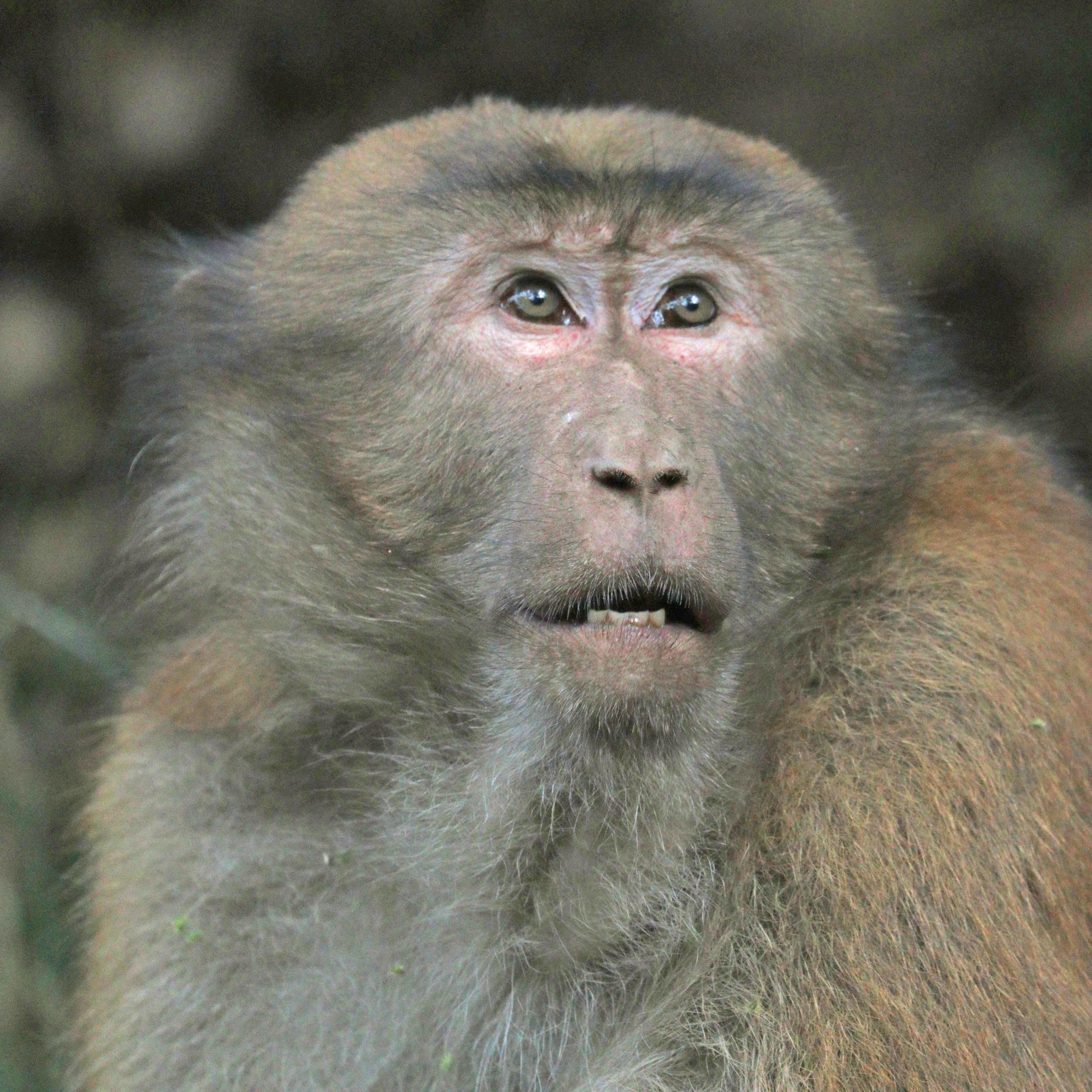
M. a. pelops in Nagarjun Forest, Kathmandu, Nepal

The Assam macaque (Macaca assamensis) or Assamese macaque is a macaque of the Old World monkey family native to South and Southeast Asia. Since 2008, it has been listed as Near Threatened on the IUCN Red List, as it is experiencing significant declines due to poaching, habitat degradation, and fragmentation.

== Characteristics ==
The Assam macaque has a yellowish-grey to dark brown pelage. The facial skin is dark brownish to purplish. The head has a dark fringe of hair on the cheeks directed backwards to the ears. The hair on the crown is parted in the middle. The shoulders, head and arms tend to be paler than the hindquarters, which are greyish. The tail is well-haired and short. Head-to-body-length measures 51 to 73.5 cm (20.1 to 28.9 in), and the tail is 15 to 30 cm (5.9 to 11.8 in) long. Adult weight is 5 to 10 kg (11 to 22 lb).

== Distribution and habitat ==
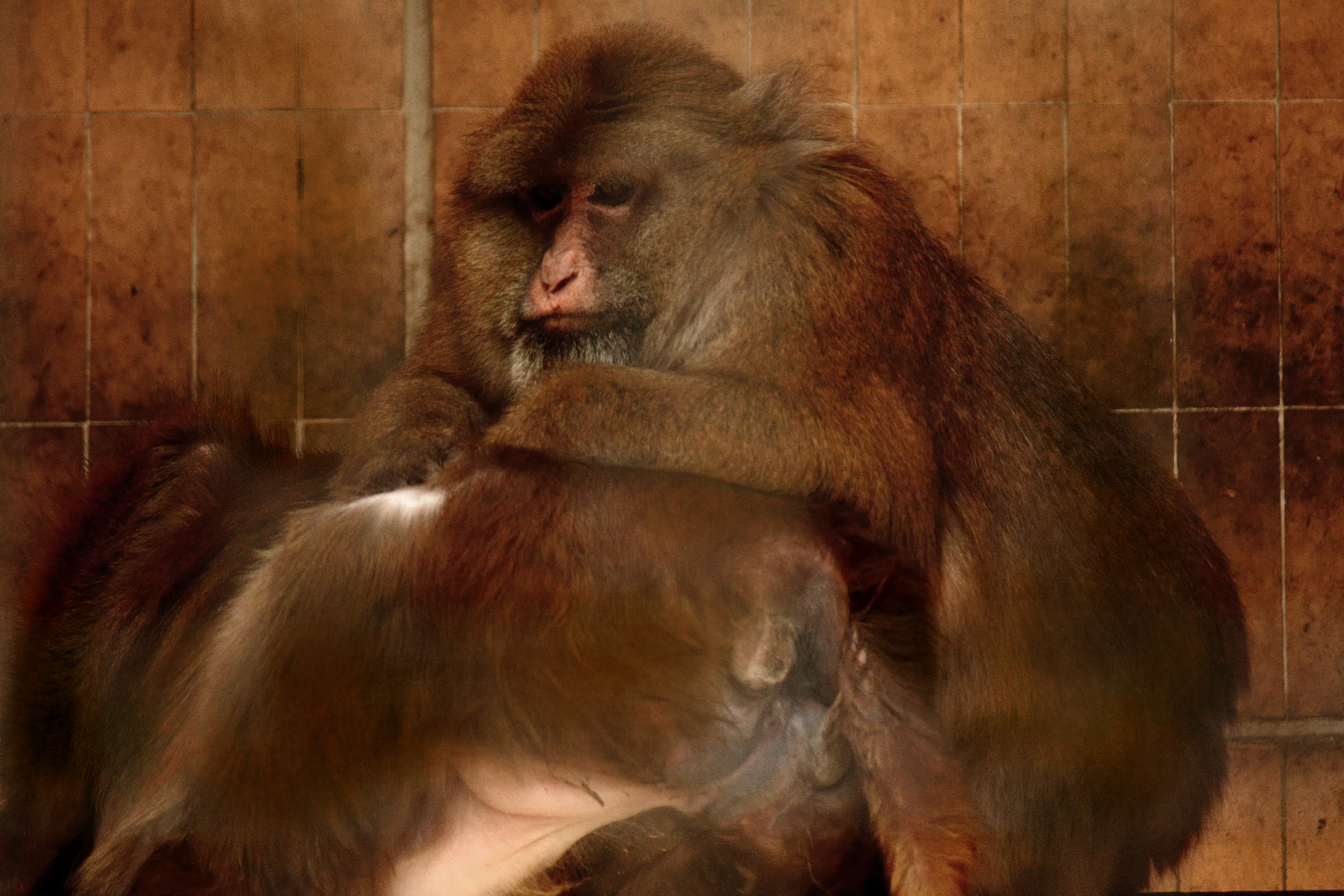
Assam macaques in Shanghai Zoo

In Nepal, the Assam macaque occurs east of the Kali Gandaki river at elevations of 200–1,800 m (660–5,910 ft). In northeastern India, it lives in tropical and subtropical semievergreen forests, dry deciduous and montane forests up to elevations of 4,000 m (13,000 ft). In Laos and Vietnam, it prefers elevations above 500 m (1,600 ft). It usually inhabits hilly areas above 1,000 m (3,300 ft), but in the wetter east it also occurs in the lowlands below this elevation. In limestone karst forests, it also occurs at lower elevations.

== Ecology and behaviour ==
Assam macaques are diurnal, and at times both arboreal and terrestrial. They are omnivorous and feed on fruits, leaves, invertebrates and cereals. In Namdapha National Park, Arunachal Pradesh, 15 groups were recorded in 2002 comprising 209 individuals. The population had a group density of 1.11 individuals per 1 km^{2} (0.39 sq mi), and an average group size of 13.93 individuals. During a survey in Nepal's Langtang National Park in 2007, a total of 213 Assamese macaques were encountered in 9 groups in the study area of 113 km^{2} (44 sq mi). Troop sizes varied between 13 and 35 individuals, with a mean troop size of 23.66 individuals, and comprised 31% adult females, 16% adult males, and their young of various ages. They preferred maize kernals, followed by potato tubers, but also raided fields with wheat, buckwheat, and millet.

== Threats ==
The threats to this species' habitat include selective logging and various forms of anthropogenic development and activities, alien invasives, hunting and trapping for sport, medicine, food, and the pet trade. Additionally, hybridization with adjacent species poses a threat to some populations.

== Conservation ==
Macaca assamensis is listed in CITES Appendix II. It is legally protected in all countries of occurrence. For the populations in India, the species is listed under Schedule II, part I of the Indian Wildlife Act.
