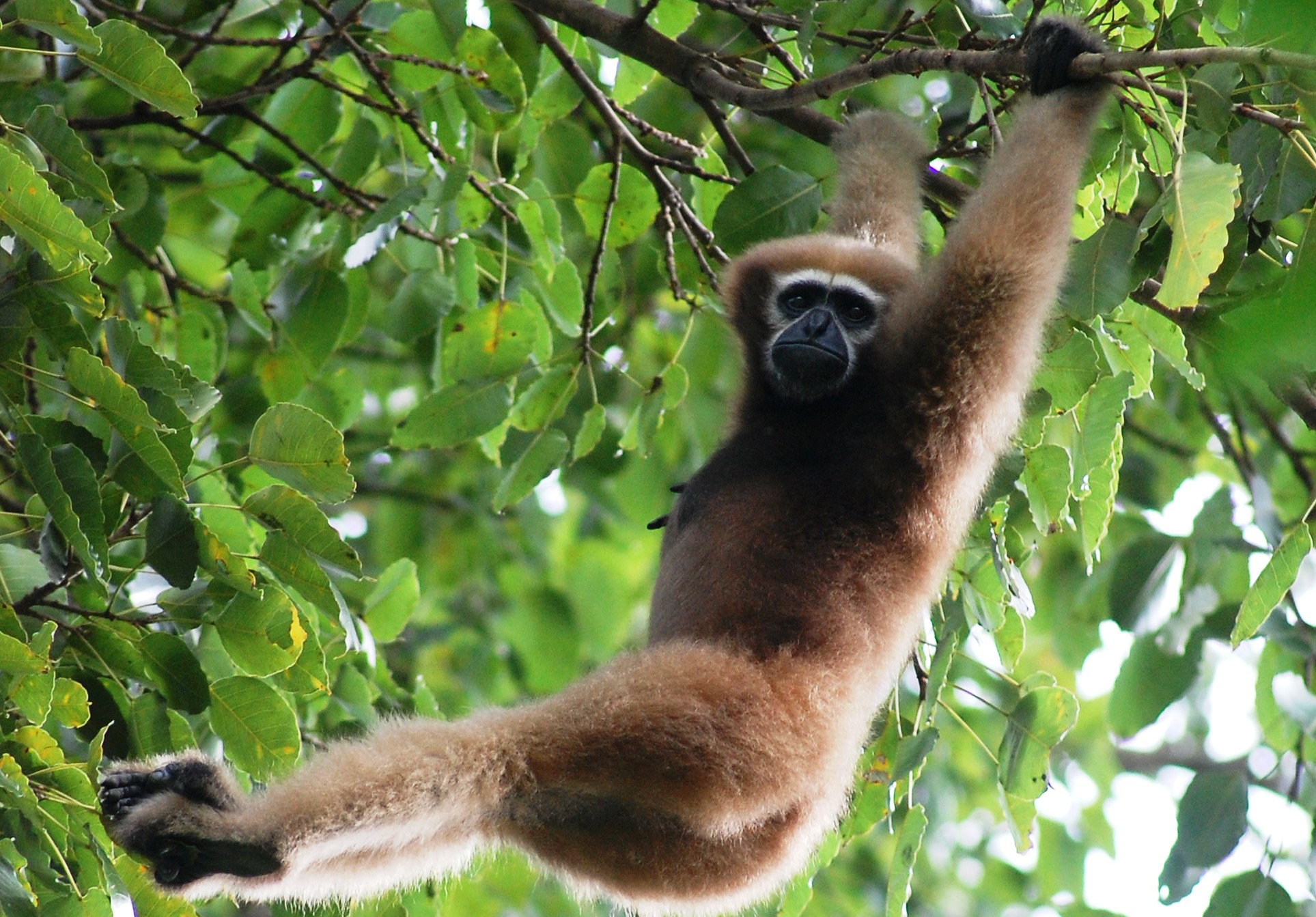

Scientific classification
- Kingdom: Animalia
- Phylum: Chordata
- Class: Mammalia
- Infraclass: Placentalia
- Order: Primates
- Superfamily: Hominoidea
- Family: Hylobatidae
- Genus: Hoolock; Mootnick & Groves, 2005

Type species
- Simia hoolock Harlan, 1834

Species
- Hoolock hoolock; Hoolock leuconedys; Hoolock tianxing

= Hoolock gibbon =

Hoolock gibbons

Genus of apes

The hoolock gibbons are three primate species of genus Hoolock in the gibbon family, Hylobatidae, native to eastern Bangladesh, Northeast India, Myanmar, and Southwest China.

== Description ==
Hoolocks are the second-largest of the gibbons, after the siamang. They reach a size of 60 to 90 cm (24 to 35 in) and weigh 6 to 9 kg (13 to 20 lb). The sexes are about the same size, but they differ considerably in coloration; males are black-colored with remarkable white brows, while females have a grey-brown fur, which is darker at the chest and neck. White rings around their eyes and mouths give their faces a mask-like appearance. The Oxford English Dictionary says that the name "hoolock" is from "a language of Assam."

== Distribution ==
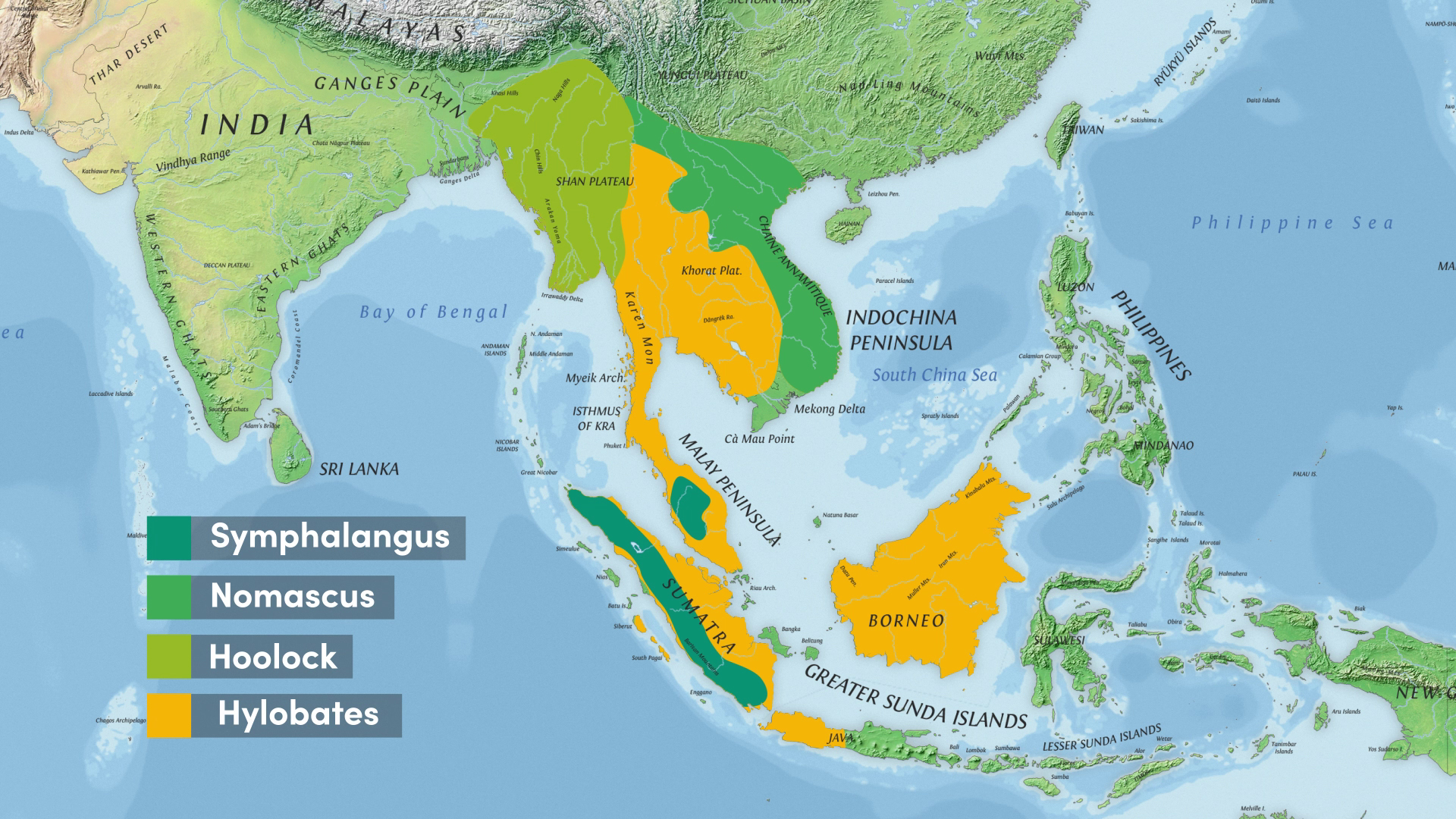
Range of the hoolock and other gibbons

In northeast India, the western hoolock gibbons' range extends into the seven northeastern states of India, Arunachal Pradesh, Assam, Manipur, Meghalaya, Mizoram, Nagaland, and Tripura. The hoolock is found south of Brahmaputra river, and the north bank and east areas of the Dibang river. In Assam the species is protected at the Hollongapar Gibbon sanctuary, which support 125 individuals of the species, as of 2023. In Meghalaya they are found in every district.

In Bangladesh, the western hoolock gibbons were distributed across 35 forest fragments. The largest of these (Lawachara and Kaptai) supported 42 and 84 individuals respectively, but 17 of the fragments had less than ten individuals. For a better overview the forest fragments are grouped into 13 areas. All areas are located within Chittagong and Sylhet divisions, mostly near the eastern border of the country.

In China, in historical times, the skywalker gibbon was recorded in nine counties in the west bank of the Salween River in westernmost Yunnan province. Based on more recent interview surveys conducted in October–November 2008 and field surveys conducted in Mar, Apr, and Aug 2009, the current Chinese population of hoolock gibbons was found to be restricted to three counties (Baoshan, Tengchong, and Yingjiang). The population size was estimated to be less than 200 individuals.

In Myanmar, all three species of hoolock gibbon can be found in the forested areas west of Thanlwin river. Of all four distribution countries, Myanmar holds the key population of all three species.

== Behaviour and diet ==
Like the other gibbons, they are diurnal and arboreal, brachiating through the trees with their long arms. They live together in monogamous pairs, which stake out a territory. Their calls serve to locate family members and ward off other gibbons from their territory. Their diet consists mainly of fruits, insects and leaves.

== Breeding and lifecycle ==
Young hoolocks are born after a 7-month gestation, with milky white or buff-colored hair. After about 6 months, the hair of males darkens and turns black, while the females' hair remains buff-colored throughout their lives. After 8–9 years, they are fully mature and their fur reaches its final coloration. Their life expectancy in the wild is about 25 years.

== Classification ==
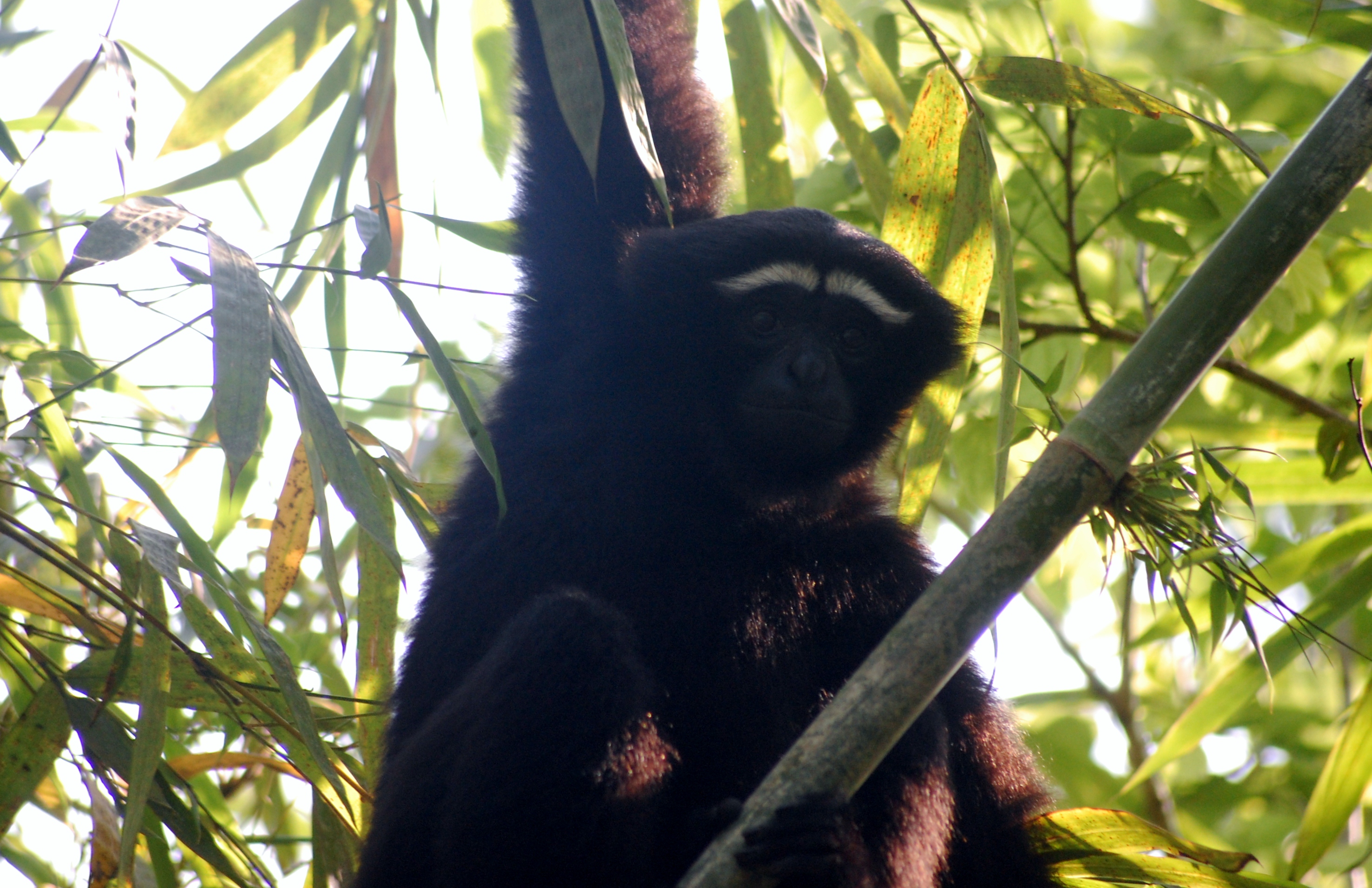
Western hoolock gibbon

Call of hoolock gibbon from Hoollongapar Gibbon Sanctuary, Assam

The classification of this gibbon has changed several times in the past few years. Classically, all gibbons were classified in the genus Hylobates, with the exception of the siamang. After some studies, the genus was divided into three subgenera (including the siamangs Symphalangus), and then into four (recognizing Bunopithecus as the hoolock subgenus distinct from other gibbon subgenera). These four subgenera were elevated to full genus status. However, the type species for Bunopithecus is Bunopithecus sericus, an extinct gibbon or gibbon-like ape from Sichuan, China. Very recent investigations have shown that the hoolock gibbons are not closely related to B. sericus, so they have been placed in their own genus, Hoolock. In the process, the two subspecies of hoolock gibbons have been raised to species level. A new subspecies of the western hoolock gibbon has been described recently from northeastern India, which has been named the Mishmi Hills hoolock gibbon, H. hoolock mishmiensis. A further new species, H. tianxing, with an estimated population of about 200, was discovered in southwest China in 2017.

The species of hoolock are:

Genus Hoolock – Mootnick & Groves, 2005 – three species
Common name	Scientific name and subspecies	Range	Size and ecology	IUCN status and estimated population
Western hoolock gibbon	Hoolock hoolock (Harlan, 1834)	India, Bangladesh, and Myanmar	Size: Habitat: Diet:	EN
Eastern hoolock gibbon	Hoolock leuconedys (Groves, 1967)	China(Yunnan) and Myanmar	Size: Habitat: Diet:	VU
Skywalker hoolock gibbon	Hoolock tianxing Fan et al., 2017	Myanmar and southwestern China	Size: Habitat: Diet:	EN 150
