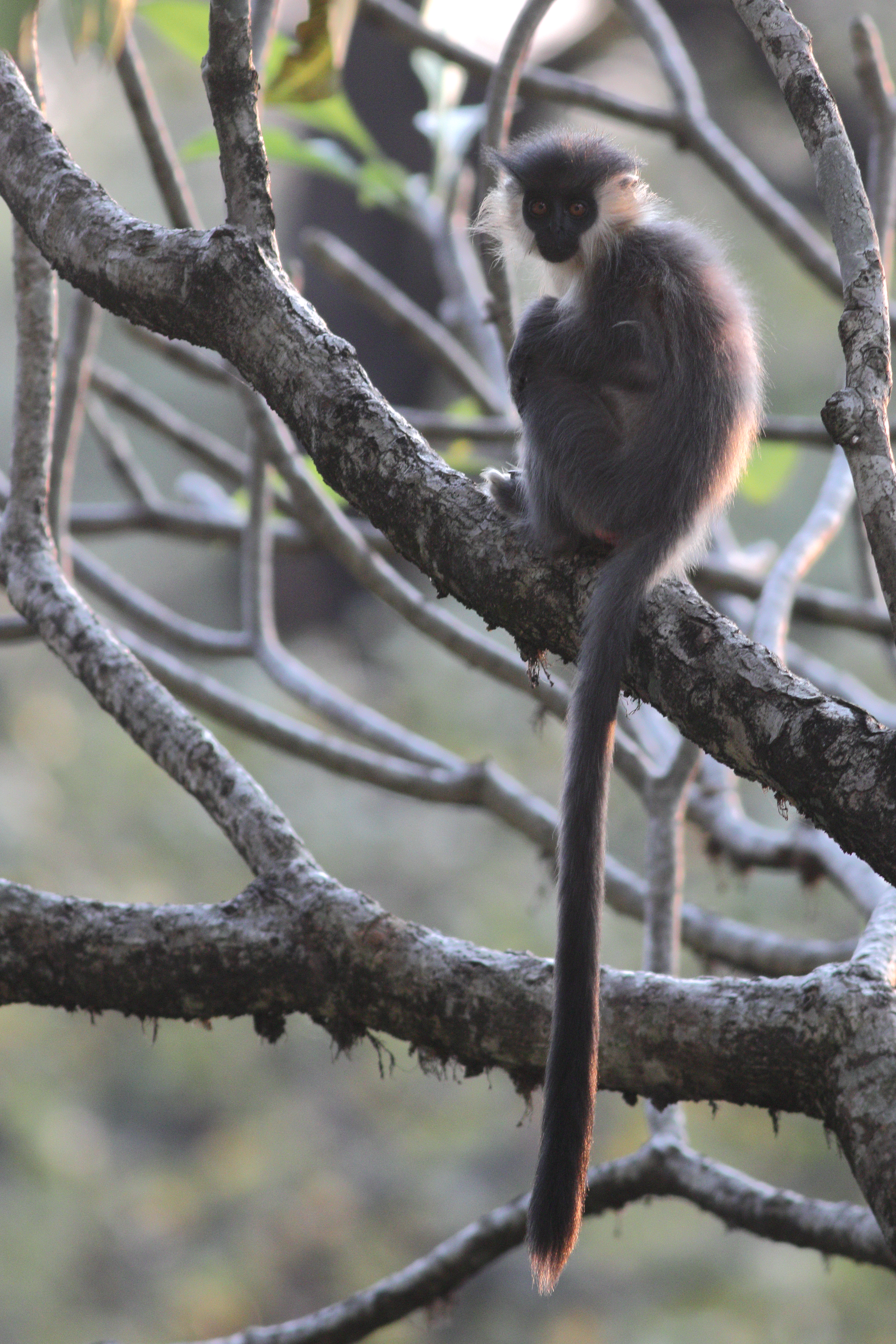
- Capped langur in Manas National Park

Conservation status
- Vulnerable (IUCN 3.1)
- CITES Appendix I

Scientific classification
- Kingdom: Animalia
- Phylum: Chordata
- Class: Mammalia
- Infraclass: Placentalia
- Order: Primates
- Family: Cercopithecidae
- Genus: Trachypithecus
- Species: T. pileatus

Binomial name
- Trachypithecus pileatus (Blyth, 1843)
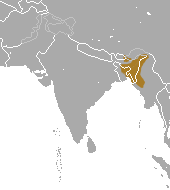
- Capped langur range

= Capped langur =

Species of mammal

The capped langur (Trachypithecus pileatus) is a primate species in the family Cercopithecidae native to subtropical and tropical dry forests in northeast India, Bhutan, Bangladesh and Myanmar. It is arboreal and feeds on 43 plant species.

== Taxonomy ==
The capped langur was described by Edward Blyth in 1843. Four subspecies of the capped langur are recognized as of 2005:

- T. p. pileatus
- T. p. durga
- T. p. brahma
- T. p. tenebricus

== Distribution and habitat ==
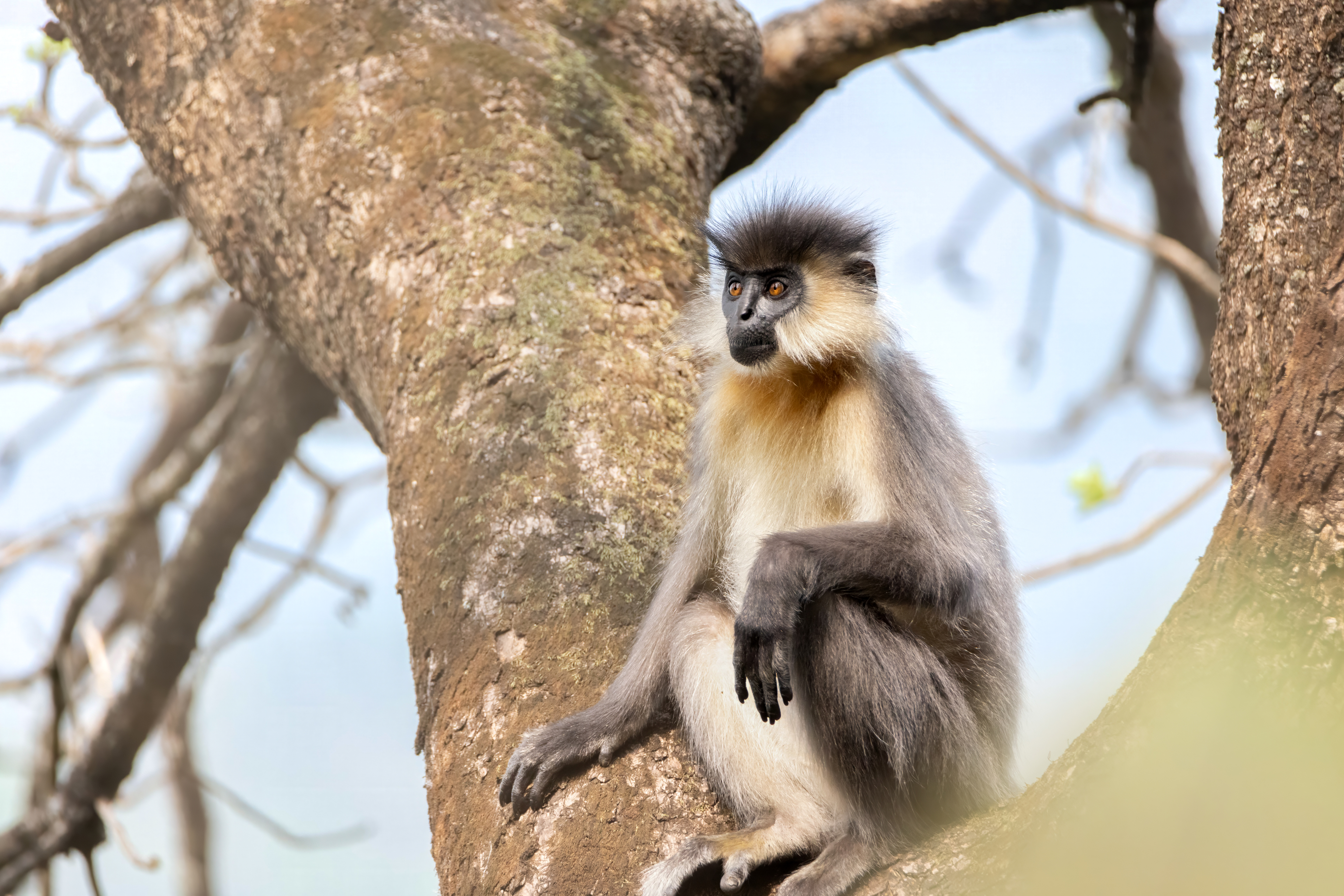
Capped langur sitting on a tree along the Manas River

The capped langur occurs in northeast India, Bhutan, Bangladesh and Myanmar, where it inhabits subtropical and tropical dry forests.

== Behavior and ecology ==
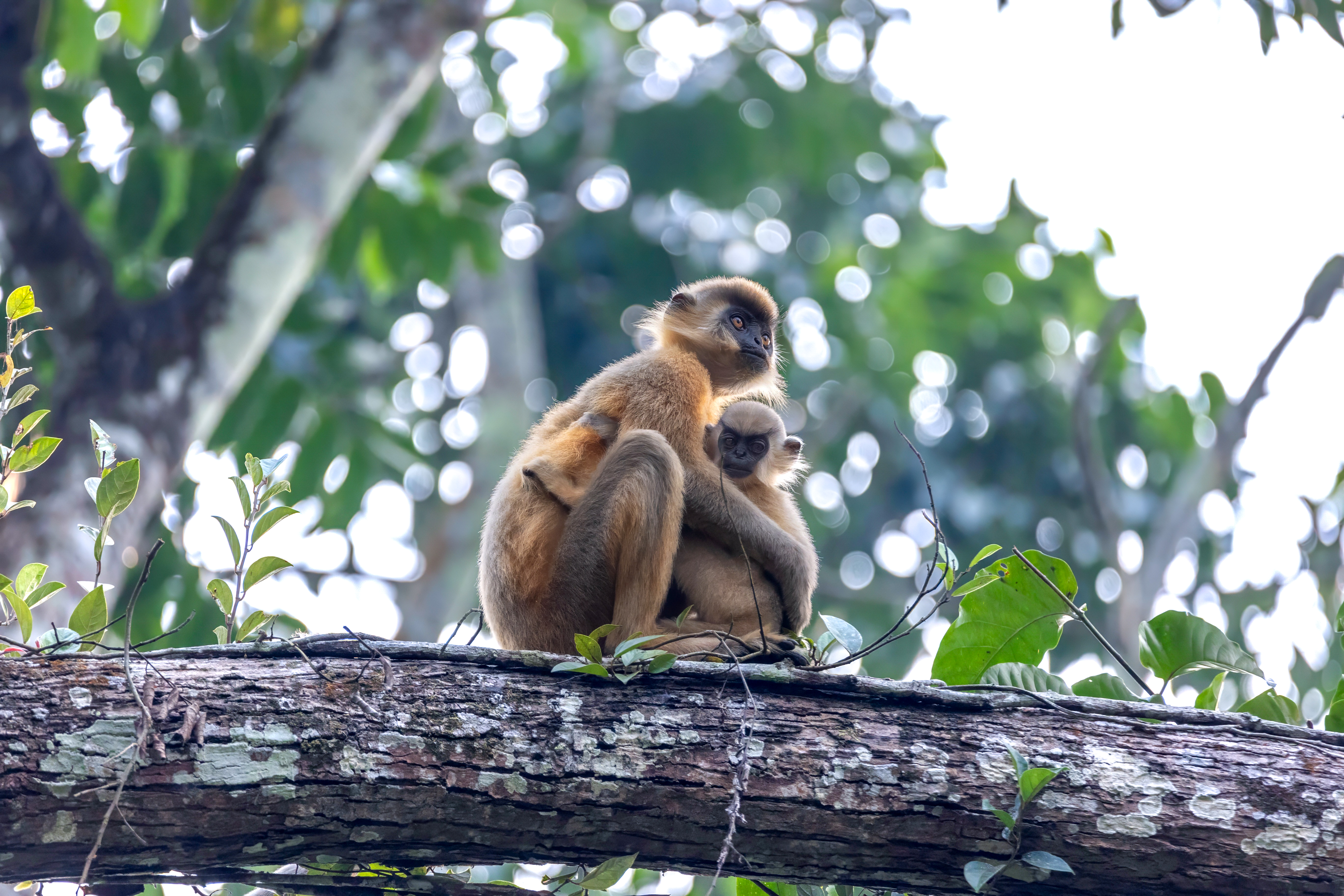
Capped langur mother with infant in Hoollongapar Gibbon Sanctuary

Capped langurs observed in Arunachal Pradesh spent nearly 40% of the day time feeding on leaves, flowers and fruits. Leaves contributed nearly 60% of the diet, and they foraged on as many as 43 different plant species.
