= Badhani =

Bhadani
- Village
- Bhadani
- Location in Haryana, India Bhadani (India)
- Country: India
- State: Haryana
- Region: North India
- District: Jhajjar

Languages
  - Official: Hindi
- Time zone: UTC+5:30 (IST)
- PIN: 124104
- ISO 3166 code: IN-HR
- Vehicle registration: HR-14
- Website: haryana.gov.in

Bhadani is a village in Jhajjar Tehsil in Jhajjar district of Haryana state, India. It belongs to Rohtak Division. Bhadani and Khera (Bhadana) are two villages adjacent to each other. It is located 10 km east of the district headquarters, Jhajjar.
