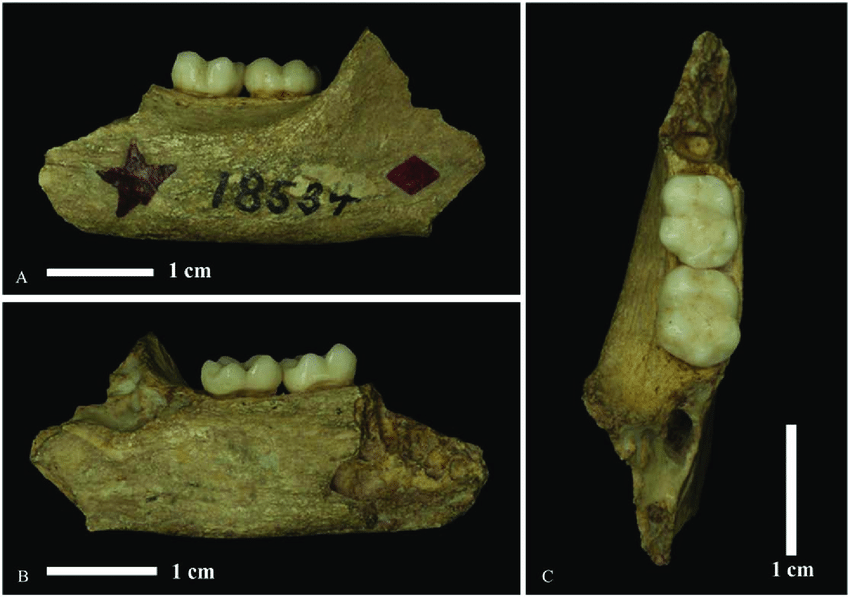

Scientific classification
- Kingdom: Animalia
- Phylum: Chordata
- Class: Mammalia
- Order: Primates
- Superfamily: Hominoidea
- Family: Hylobatidae
- Genus: †Bunopithecus; Matthew & Granger, 1923
- Species: †B. sericus

Binomial name
- †Bunopithecus sericus Matthew & Granger, 1923

= Bunopithecus =

Bunopithecus Temporal range: Middle Pleistocene

Genus of apes

Bunopithecus is an extinct genus of primate represented by one species, Bunopithecus sericus, a gibbon or gibbon-like ape. Its remains were first discovered in Sichuan, China, in strata from the Middle Pleistocene.

Although the three hoolock gibbon species were once included in the genus Bunopithecus, they have recently been removed and B. sericus remains as the only known species of this genus.
