= Kherka Gujjar =

- Village
- Location in Haryana, India Kherka Gujjar (India)
- Country: India
- State: Haryana
- Region: North India
- District: Jhajjar
- Established: 1385 AD
- Founder: Choudhary Khema
- Named for: Maintained By Naveen Deswal SO Rajkawar SO Dalip Singh

Government
  - Sarpanch 2022-2027: SUNIL KUMAR

Languages
  - Official: Hindi
- Time zone: UTC+5:30 (IST)
- PIN: 124507
- ISO 3166 code: IN-HR
- Vehicle registration: HR-89
- Website: haryana.gov.in

Kherka Gujjar is a village in Badli Tehsil in Jhajjar District of Haryana, India. It is located 15 km towards East from District headquarters Jhajjar. 17 km from Bahadurgarh. 272 km from State capital Chandigarh. Its Pin code is 124507 and postal head office is Bahadurgarh.

HISTORY

Though Kherka Gujjar is stated to be more than a thousand-year old, the present-day Jats inhabitants settled here in around 1385 AD when Choudhary Khema of Ladhaut came here after purchasing a 4000-bigha plot by paying Rs. 500 to Chanchal Gujjar, the then owner of the land. Chanchal Gujjar moved away and since then, the descendants of Choudhary Khema are occupying the present land. That is why, the name “Kherka Gujjar” is still being used.

One monument of historical importance is situated just outside this village - a huge one-acre complex called ‘Asthal’ which also has its land property in neighbouring 12 villages. This ‘Asthal’ is now managed by one Swamiji. The complex has an old monastery which looks like a fort, built in small bricks and limestone apart from one Shiva temple and a pond nearly. It also has an underground storage hall ( तहखाना) which is believed to have some old weapons contained therein but people hesitate to visit that dark place. From the neighbouring Shiva temple, ancient stairs go down the holy pond. The complex was built by Chhatrapati Shivaji for the purpose of keeping some of his soldiers/spies who could keep an eye on the activities of Aurangzeb’s then capital, Delhi (which is just 40 kilometres from this place).

People of this village believe in a deity ‘Dada Jasram Devta’. Many of them believe that this god has given a special protection to the villagers – though the village has traditionally sent many young men into armed forces, till today none of them has so far lost life in wars or while serving in army - perhaps, as the belief persists, due to blessings of ‘Dada Jasram Devta’ !
