= On Tour: Please Leave Quietly =

Video by PJ Harvey
- Released: 1 May 2006
- Recorded: 2004
- Genre: Alternative rock
- Length: 108:00
- Label: Universal Island
- Director: Maria Mochnacz

PJ Harvey chronology
Reeling with PJ Harvey (1994)	On Tour: Please Leave Quietly (2006)	Let England Shake: 12 Short Films by Seamus Murphy (2011)

On Tour: Please Leave Quietly is a video album by English alternative rock musician PJ Harvey, released on 1 May 2006 on Universal Island. The film was directed by Maria Mochnacz and released only on DVD.

The video features a selection of live performances from Harvey's 2004 world tour for the release of Uh Huh Her (2004), including two unreleased songs "Uh Huh Her" and "Evol." The video also features backstage footage and a bonus feature on the DVD includes a 28-minute interview with Harvey.

== Track listing ==
1. "Meet Ze Monsta" – 4:41
2. "Dress" – 4:00
3. "Uh Huh Her" – 3:13
4. "Taut" – 3:22
5. "Down by the Water" – 2:49
6. "It's You" – 5:21
7. "Big Exit" – 3:21
8. "Harder" – 4:44
9. "The Darker Days of Me & Him" – 5:54
10. "A Perfect Day Elise" – 3:25
11. "Victory" – 2:53
12. "Catherine" – 4:04
13. "Who the Fuck?" – 3:00
14. "Evol" – 5:32
15. "My Beautiful Leah" – 2:53
16. "The Letter" – 3:41
- Also includes backstage footage throughout.

=== Bonus feature ===
1. "Interview"^{[I]}
- I The interview was also released as an electronic press kit to Uh Huh Her in 2004.

== Personnel ==
Musicians

- PJ Harvey – vocals, guitar
- Josh Klinghoffer – guitar
- Dingo – bass
- Rob Ellis – drums, percussion, backing vocals

Crew

- Maria Mochnacz – director, editor, artwork
- Head – sound engineer, sound mixing
- Rob Crane – layout, design

== See also ==
- Uh Huh Her (2004)
