= Reeling with PJ Harvey =

Video by PJ Harvey
- Released: 14 February 1994
- Recorded: 1992–1993
- Genre: Alternative rock, indie rock
- Length: 84:03
- Label: PolyGram
- Director: Maria Mochnacz

PJ Harvey chronology
Reeling with PJ Harvey (1994)	On Tour: Please Leave Quietly (2006)

Reeling with PJ Harvey (sometimes simply known as Reeling) is a video album by English alternative rock musician PJ Harvey, released on 14 February 1994 on PolyGram. The film was directed by Maria Mochnacz and was only released on VHS.

Most of the footage featured in Reeling is live footage from a performance at the London Forum in May 1993. Other footage featured throughout includes backstage footage, in-studio footage from the Rid of Me sessions, extracts from interviews, and two full-length music videos of "50ft Queenie" and "Man-Size."

== Track listing ==
1. "Snake" (live) 2:10
2. "Naked Cousin" (live) 4:07
3. "50ft Queenie" 2:23
4. "Victory" (live) 4:00
5. "Man-Size Sextet" (live) 2:59
6. "Primed and Ticking" (live) 3:21
7. "M-Bike" (live) 3:00
8. "Wang Dang Doodle" (live) 3:07
9. "Missed" (live) 4:54
10. "Hook" (live) 4:40
11. "Rid of Me" (live) 5:00
12. "Me-Jane" (live) 3:00
13. "Man-Size" 3:16
14. "Legs" 3:39
- Also includes backstage footage, in-studio footage and extracts from interviews throughout.

== Personnel ==
PJ Harvey Trio

- PJ Harvey – vocals, guitar
- Steve Vaughan – bass
- Rob Ellis – drums, percussion, backing vocals

Crew

- Maria Mochnacz – director, producer, recording (tour footage)
- Peter Fowler – producer, recording (live footage)
- Nick Ryle – executive producer
- John Mayes – on-line editor
- Stuart Robertson – on-line editor
- Pete Thomas – sound producer
- Cormac Tohill – sound engineer
- Will Shapland – sound recording
- Dave Porter – sound recording
- Mark Johnson – sound recording
- Stuart Luck – camera operator
- Derek Penell – camera operator
- Peter Edwards – camera operator
- Mark Reeson – camera operator
- Simon Jacobs – camera operator
- Jo Higson – camera assistant
- Chris Libert – camera assistant
- Steve Court – vision engineer

== See also ==
- Rid of Me (1993)
- 4-Track Demos (1993)
- PJ Harvey discography
