= The Peel Sessions 1991–2004 =

Compilation album by PJ Harvey
- Released: 23 October 2006
- Recorded: 29 October 1991–16 December 2004
- Studio: Maida Vale Studios in London and Peel Acres in Great Finborough, United Kingdom
- Genre: Alternative rock
- Length: 41:46
- Label: Island
- Producer: Mike Robinson; Alison Howe; Simon Askew; Andy Rogers

PJ Harvey chronology
Uh Huh Her (2004)	The Peel Sessions 1991–2004 (2006)	White Chalk (2007)

The Peel Sessions 1991–2004 is a compilation album by English alternative rock musician PJ Harvey, released on 23 October 2006 on Island Records.

== Release ==
The Peel Sessions 1991–2004 was released on 23 October 2006 in the United Kingdom, Europe, Canada and the United States on Island Records. The album was pressed on CD and LP. John Peel died two years prior to the album's release and Harvey included a tribute message in the album's liner notes that read: "More than I would ever care to admit for fear of embarrassment to both sides, but I sought his approval always. It mattered. Every Peel Session I did, I did for him. It is with much love that I chose these songs, in his memory. A way of saying 'Thank You', once more. Thank You, John."

The album charted in two countries upon its release. It peaked at number 121 in the UK Albums Chart and number 46 in Ultratop's Belgian Albums Chart in Flanders.

== Critical reception ==
Professional ratings
Aggregate scores
Source	Rating
Metacritic	77/100
Review scores
Source	Rating
AllMusic	4/5 stars
The Austin Chronicle	3/5 stars
Robert Christgau	(3-star Honorable Mention)
Drowned in Sound	9/10
Mojo	2/5 stars
NME	9/10
Pitchfork Media	7.9/10
The Rolling Stone Album Guide	3.5/5 stars
Stylus Magazine	B+
Uncut	4/5 stars

Upon its release, The Peel Sessions 1991–2004 received largely positive critical acclaim. At Metacritic, which assigns a normalised rating out of 100 to reviews from mainstream critics, the album received an average score of 77, based on 12 reviews, indicating "generally favorable reviews". AllMusic reviewer Heather Phares awarded the album four of out five stars and said the album "feels like a thank you and goodbye to a longtime friend" adding "as good as PJ Harvey's albums are, her concerts are even more striking, and her rapport with Peel just adds to the intimacy and intensity of these songs." Drowned in Sound stated that it "serves as a most welcome and convincing re-reminder of exactly how good PJ Harvey is; it's a record which has simple enjoyment merit as well as being of sound development/obsessive collectors item interest" in its 9/10 review. Matthew Murphy of Pitchfork Media rated the album 7.9/10 and described it as "a vibrant living record whose nervy, protean spirit pushes it miles beyond mere alt-rock radio nostalgia" further adding "that none of these performances ever feels like a throwaway, and each veritably ripples with spontaneous, one-take-only passion." Stylus Magazine's Kevin Pearson gave the album a B+ rating saying that "the body of work represented gives both fans and first-timers something to salivate over" but also noted that "several sessions have been overlooked entirely." Uncut and NME also gave the album positive reviews—four out of five stars and 9/10, respectively—with Uncut summarising the album as "stark, often stunning."

== Track listing ==
All tracks are written by PJ Harvey unless otherwise noted.

No.	Title	Writer(s)	Session date	Length
1.	"Oh My Lover" (originally on Dry)		29 October 1991	3:54
2.	"Victory" (originally on Dry)		29 October 1991	3:33
3.	"Sheela-Na-Gig" (originally on Dry)		29 October 1991	3:23
4.	"Water" (originally on Dry)		29 October 1991	4:30
5.	"Naked Cousin" (originally on The Crow: City of Angels soundtrack)		2 March 1993	4:09
6.	"Wang Dang Doodle" (originally on "Man-Size" single)	Willie Dixon	2 March 1993	3:19
7.	"Losing Ground" (originally on "That Was My Veil" single)	Rainer Ptacek	5 September 1996	2:59
8.	"Snake" (originally on Rid of Me)		5 September 1996	1:56
9.	"That Was My Veil" (originally on Dance Hall at Louse Point)	Harvey, John Parish	5 September 1996	3:06
10.	"This Wicked Tongue" (originally on Stories from the City, Stories from the Sea)		10 November 2000	3:46
11.	"Beautiful Feeling" (originally on Stories from the City, Stories from the Sea)		10 November 2000	3:54
12.	"You Come Through" (originally on Uh Huh Her)		16 December 2004	3:17
Total length:				41:46

== Personnel ==
All personnel credits adapted from the album's liner notes.

PJ Harvey Trio

- PJ Harvey – vocals, guitar (1–11)
- Steve Vaughan – bass (1–6)
- Rob Ellis – drums, backing vocals (1–6, 10, 11), keyboards (10, 11)

Other musicians

- John Parish – guitar, keyboards (7–9)
- Margaret Fiedler – guitar, cello (10, 11)
- Tim Farthing – guitar (10, 11)
- Eric Drew Feldman – bass, keyboards, backing vocals (10, 11)
- Josh Klinghoffer – guitar (12)

Technical personnel

- Mike Robinson – producer (1–6)
- Alison Howe – producer (7–9)
- Simon Askew – producer (10, 11)
- Andy Rogers – producer (12)
- James Birwistle – engineer (1–4)
- Ralph Jordan – engineer (5, 6)
- Nick Fountain – engineer (7–9)
- Miti Adhikari – engineer (12)

Design personnel

- Rob Crane – layout, design
- Anja Grabert – photography

== Chart positions ==
Chart (2006)	Peak position
Belgian Albums Chart (Vl)	46
UK Albums Chart	121
