= This Is Love (PJ Harvey song) =

Single by PJ Harvey

from the album Stories from the City, Stories from the Sea
- Released: 2001
- Studio: Linford Manor (Milton Keynes, England)
- Genre: Punk blues
- Length: 3:48
- Label: Island
- Songwriter(s): PJ Harvey
- Producer(s): Rob Ellis; Mick Harvey; Sam Cunningham

PJ Harvey singles chronology
"A Place Called Home" (2001)	"This Is Love" (2001)	"The Letter" (2004)

Music video
- "This Is Love" on YouTube

"This Is Love" is a song by English alternative rock musician PJ Harvey. It is the tenth track from her fifth studio album, Stories from the City, Stories from the Sea (2000) and was released as a single in 2001 under the title "This Is Love/You Said Something". It charted on UK Singles Chart, peaking at number 41. The blues-influenced song was nominated for the Grammy Award for Best Female Rock Vocal Performance in 2002 but lost to Lucinda Williams song "Get Right With God".

== Musical style and lyrics ==
The song was described as "blues punk" and "one of the blues-tinged numbers" off the record. The guitar riff of the song was interpreted as an homage to The Stooges song "No Fun" and was compared to those of The Heartbreakers song "Chinese Rocks." According to Amy Britton, the author of Revolution Rock: The Albums Which Defined Two Ages, lyrically the song "places sex as a priority over the anomalies of the world." Also on the lyrics of the song, Jason Heller of The A.V. Club wrote: "PJ doesn’t bring her love to anyone, nor does she ponder whether her font of conflicted emotions and biological requirements amount to desire. She just states, “This is love / This is love / That I’m feeling.” Period. No searching of the soul needed."

== Critical reception ==
Andrew Mueller of Spin stated that the song "flirts with a hitherto uncharacteristic Liz Phair-ish playfullness" and described it as "exuberant". Christian David Hoard, one of the authors of The New Rolling Stone Album Guide praised the song, writing: "on the bombastic and awesomely raunchy "This Is Love," arguably her best song ever, she says a big fuck-you to psychosis and sadness as guitars crunch and garments hit the floor."

== Music video ==
The music video for the song was directed by Sophie Muller, who also collaborated with Harvey on the music videos of "Good Fortune" and "A Place Called Home." It features Harvey, who is wearing a fringe-sleeved white suit and red lipstick, performing the song on the guitar at a studio and whipping her hair around.

== Track listing ==
CD

1. "This Is Love" – 3:48
2. "You Said Something" – 3:23
3. "A Place Called Home" (taken from Lamacq Live) – 3:41

Australia / Asia CD Single

1. "This Is Love" – 3:48
2. "You Said Something" – 3:23

7"

1. "This Is Love" – 3:44
2. "Angelene" (taken from Lamacq Live) – 3:46

US VHS Promo

1. "This Is Love"

== Chart positions ==
Chart (2001)	Peak position
UK Singles Chart	41
