= Good Fortune (song) =

2000 single by PJ Harvey

Single by PJ Harvey

from the album Stories from the City, Stories from the Sea
- B-side: "66 Promises"; "Memphis"; "30"
- Released: 13 November 2000
- Recorded: March–April 2000
- Studio: Linford Manor (Milton Keynes)
- Genre: Alternative rock; indie rock
- Length: 3:23
- Label: Island
- Songwriter: PJ Harvey
- Producers: Rob Ellis; Mick Harvey; PJ Harvey

PJ Harvey singles chronology
"The Wind" (1998)	"Good Fortune" (2000)	"A Place Called Home" (2001)

Music video
- "Good Fortune" on YouTube

"Good Fortune" is a song by English alternative rock musician PJ Harvey. It is the second track and lead single from her fifth studio album Stories from the City, Stories from the Sea, and was released on 13 November 2000 on Island Records. In the United States, it was shipped to college radio on 26 October. The song was written by Harvey and self-produced with Mick Harvey and Rob Ellis.

Upon its release, "Good Fortune" received positive critical acclaim and charted in both France and the United Kingdom, peaking at number 100 and number 41 respectively. The song had an accompanying music video, directed by Sophie Muller.

== Origin and recording ==
"Good Fortune" was recorded during the sessions for Stories from the City, Stories from the Sea throughout March and April 2000 at Linford Manor in Milton Keynes, United Kingdom. The song was one of nineteen songs PJ Harvey had written for the album, alongside the singles b-sides "Memphis" and "66 Promises." Although most of "Good Fortune" was recorded in-studio, parts of the song were recorded alone by Harvey on a 4-track cassette recorder in New York City and Dorset. The song was mixed by Victor Van Vugt at the Fallout Shelter in May 2000.

== Composition ==
"Good Fortune" was written by Harvey and produced by Harvey, multi-instrumentalist Mick Harvey, and former bandmate Rob Ellis. It is set in common time (4/4) and composed in the key of A minor. The verse follows a repetitive pattern of two chords (Am_{7}–G_{6}) and the final refrains of each verse repeat two chords (C–F_{5}). The chorus has a rising bass progression composed of four chords (Am_{7}–G_{6}/B–C–D) and the song ends on G_{5}.

The song's lyrics make allusions to New York, a theme shared with other songs on Stories from the City, Stories from the Sea. Harvey lived in New York prior to the recording of the album.

== Release and reception ==
"Good Fortune" was released in the United Kingdom on 13 November 2000 on Island Records. It was the lead single from Stories from the City, Stories from the Sea and was pressed on CD and 7" vinyl. Each pressing contained alternate b-sides, including "66 Promises", "Memphis" and "30." An enhanced CD version was released in Australia featuring all b-sides, two music videos and an electronic press kit. Promotional CDs were released for radio airplay in the United States and Spain. The song charted on the French Singles Chart, peaking at number 100, and entered the UK Singles Chart at number 41.

Critical reception to "Good Fortune" was positive. A number of reviews drew comparisons between Harvey and fellow female musicians Chrissie Hynde and Patti Smith. Allmusic reviewer Heather Phares described "Good Fortune" as the song "on which Harvey channels both Chrissie Hynde's sexy tough girl and Patti Smith's ferocious yelp." NME's review drew a similar Patti Smith comparison, stating "Harvey's adopted her mentor's positivity, so that the urban vignettes are filled with a lust for life" and Pitchfork Media said "'Good Fortune' sustains a similar but even more banal pop sound, with Harvey distinctly recalling Chrissie Hynde, both musically and vocally."

== Music video ==
The music video for "Good Fortune" was directed by Sophie Muller. The video features Harvey walking and running through the streets of London at night and ending with Harvey entering a Kebab takeaway. The recording of the video was approximately six hours long with Harvey taking the same route each take but "changing what [she] was doing all of the time."

The video shoot faced a number of difficulties, most regarding the camera operator. The camera operator had to walk backwards while filming and his assistants had to guide him. The lighting crew had difficulty maintaining the correct lighting due to Harvey's improvised movement. Speaking of the experience, Harvey said: "the crew would have to consciously be aware all the time of where I was moving because they might have to duck to get out of the line of vision. It was hilarious because then I kind of cottoned on to if I would move in a certain position I'd be able to watch the whole fifteen-piece male crew hit the ground immediately. So, a couple of times I'd do it on purpose and bang! Flat down as quick as they could."

== Track listings ==
UK 7" single (IS 769)

1. "Good Fortune" – 3:23
2. "66 Promises" – 3:49

UK CD single (ISCD 769)

1. "Good Fortune" – 3:23
2. "66 Promises" – 3:49
3. "Memphis" – 3:51

UK CD single (ISCIDX 769)

1. "Good Fortune" – 3:23
2. "Memphis" – 3:51
3. "30" – 4:12

Australian CD single (5728652)

1. "Good Fortune" – 3:23
2. "66 Promises" – 3:49
3. "Memphis" – 3:51
4. "30" – 4:12
5. "Good Fortune" (video) – 3:18
6. "A Place Called Home" (video) – 3:39
7. Stories from the City, Stories from the Sea EPK (video) – 13:16

US promotional CD single (ISLR 15219-2)

1. "Good Fortune" – 3:19
2. "Call Out Research Hook" – 0:10

== Personnel ==
All personnel credits adapted from the Stories from the City, Stories from the Sea's liner notes.

Musicians

- PJ Harvey – vocals, guitar, producer, engineer
- Rob Ellis – drums, piano, electric piano, producer
- Mick Harvey – organ, bass, percussion, producer

Technical personnel

- Victor Van Vugt – engineer, mixing
- Howie Weinberg – mastering

Design personnel

- Rob Crane – design, artwork
- Maria Mochnacz – design, photography

== Chart positions ==
Chart (2000)	Peak position
French Singles Chart	100
UK Singles Chart	41
Chart (2001)	Peak position
Australian ARIA Singles Chart	71
