= Uh Huh Her =

Uh Huh Her may refer to:

- Uh Huh Her (album), a 2004 album by alternative rock musician PJ Harvey
- Uh Huh Her (band), an indie electropop band, named for the PJ Harvey album
