= Is This Desire? =

Studio album by PJ Harvey
- Released: 28 September 1998
- Recorded: April 1997 – 1998
- Studios: Small World, Yeovil; Whitfield Street, London
- Genres: Alternative rock; trip hop; electronic rock; electronica
- Length: 40:24
- Label: Island
- Producers: Flood; Head; PJ Harvey

PJ Harvey chronology
Dance Hall at Louse Point (1996)	Is This Desire? (1998)	Stories from the City, Stories from the Sea (2000)

Singles from Is This Desire?
- 1. "A Perfect Day Elise" Released: 14 September 1998; 2. "The Wind" Released: 11 January 1999

Is This Desire? is the fourth studio album by the English musician PJ Harvey, released on 28 September 1998 by Island Records. It was re-released on vinyl LP in late January, 2021. A separate demo compilation of tracks from the album titled Is This Desire? – Demos was also released on vinyl LP and CD. The album marked a move away from Harvey's earlier guitar-driven rock style into quieter soundscapes based around keyboards, bass and electronics.

== Background ==
Recorded on and off in Somerset and London between April 1997 and April 1998, it was co-produced by Flood, Head and Harvey herself, and featured instrumental contributions from Rob Ellis, John Parish, Mick Harvey, Eric Drew Feldman, Joe Gore and Jeremy Hogg. It marked a move away from Harvey's earlier guitar-driven rock style into subtler, quieter, atmospheric soundscapes and mood pieces based around keyboards, bass and electronics.

Harvey spoke about the making of the album in an interview with Filter magazine in 2004, indicating it was the project of which, to date, she was proudest. "Again working with Flood, again trying to find new ground, but a particularly difficult time in my life. So, it was a very, very difficult, difficult record to make and still one I find very difficult to listen to, but probably my favorite record that I've made because it had a lot of guts. I mean, I was making extremely difficult music, experimenting with techniques I hadn't used before and not really caring what other people thought about it. I'm quite proud of that one." She also told The Telegraph, "I do think Is This Desire? is the best record I ever made—maybe ever will make—and I feel that that was probably the highlight of my career. I gave 100 per cent of myself to that record. Maybe that was detrimental to my health at the same time."

John Parish reflected on the album's recording in 2021: "[Is This Desire?] is probably the most compromised album that Polly's made, largely to do with the time over which it was made ... There were two long recordings sessions and almost a year's gap between them. The bulk of the first session took place in a small studio in Yeovil, so it was much more Heath Robinson setup, and the second session, most or all of it took place in a huge expensive London studio, so there were differences in the technical capabilities of the studio, but the same musicians basically in both sessions and same producers and engineers. It's very difficult to sustain the identity of a record like that. It was also the only record where the record company came in and had a degree of creative input, which had never been sanctioned on any of the other records, certainly none of the other records I was involved with. The record company often never heard anything until they got the mastered album! ... on this album there were a couple of people who I felt took advantage of the fact Polly wasn't very well at that time. Normally she's so decisive and strong about what she feels, about what's going to happen, but on that record she wavered in the middle."

It is the first PJ Harvey album to feature lyrics printed on the inner sleeve.

The song "The Wind" was inspired by Saint Catherine, and in particular St Catherine's Chapel, Abbotsbury. The lyrics discuss the chapel's location on top of a hill, and end with an inversion of a traditional prayer which women used at the chapel to pray for a husband. The village of Abbotsbury is near PJ Harvey's home.

== Critical reception ==
Professional ratings
Review scores
Source	Rating
AllMusic	3/5 stars
Entertainment Weekly	A
The Guardian	4/5 stars
Los Angeles Times	4/4 stars
NME	6/10
Pitchfork	8.0/10 (1998); 10/10 (2025)
Q	4/5 stars
Rolling Stone	4/5 stars
Spin	8/10
The Village Voice	A−

The album was met with critical acclaim. Q magazine praised the record as "one of the most artfully truncated missives of bleakness and pain to have emerged ... since the dawn of CD", CMJ called it "another milestone in her already illustrious career", and Entertainment Weekly said it "seethes with hypnotic power"; the magazine Dazed & Confused claimed "Is This Desire? will be a classic of the next 10 if not 20 years. It has the impeccable timing of jazz, the arrangement of a classic dance track, the depth of an orchestral symphony and the emotional charge of gospel."

It received a Grammy Award nomination as Best Alternative Music Performance of 1998. Although it did not sell as well as her 1995 commercial breakthrough To Bring You My Love, it did spawn her biggest UK hit with the single "A Perfect Day Elise"; a second single, "The Wind", charted on the UK Top 30.

== Track listing ==
All tracks are written by PJ Harvey.

No.	Title	Length
1.	"Angelene"	3:34
2.	"The Sky Lit Up"	1:50
3.	"The Wind"	4:04
4.	"My Beautiful Leah"	1:59
5.	"A Perfect Day Elise"	3:06
6.	"Catherine"	4:05
7.	"Electric Light"	3:04
8.	"The Garden"	4:11
9.	"Joy"	3:40
10.	"The River"	4:52
11.	"No Girl So Sweet"	2:45
12.	"Is This Desire?"	3:25
Total length:		40:24

== Personnel ==
All personnel credits adapted from the album's liner notes.

Musicians

- PJ Harvey – vocals, guitar, keyboards
- Mick Harvey – bass, keyboards, arrangement on "Angelene"
- John Parish – guitar, keyboards, drums
- Rob Ellis – drums, percussion, keyboards, arrangement on "The Garden"
- Eric Drew Feldman – piano, keyboards, bass

Additional musicians

- Joe Gore – guitar
- Jeremy Hogg – guitar
- Terry Edwards – trumpet (10)
- Richard Hunt – violin (11)

Technical

- Flood – producer, engineer
- PJ Harvey – producer
- Head – producer
- Marius de Vries – producer, engineer, mixing, programming (2, 3)
- Andy Todd – engineer, mixing (2, 3)
- Pete Davis – programming (2, 3)
- Steve Sidelnyk – programming (2, 3)

Design

- Maria Mochnacz – art direction, design, photography
- Rob Crane – art direction, design
- PJ Harvey – photography
- Julia Hember – photography
- Nick Daly – photography

== Charts ==
Chart (1998)	Peak position
Australian ARIA Albums Chart	30
Belgian Albums Chart (Vl)	8
Belgian Albums Chart (Wa)	50
Canadian Albums Chart	59
Dutch Top 100	74
European Albums (Eurotipsheet)	18
French SNEP Albums Chart	9
Norwegian Albums Chart	5
Scottish Albums (Official Charts)	23
Swedish Albums Chart	19
UK Albums Chart	17
US Billboard 200	54

=== Singles ===
Year	Single	Peak chart positions				
Year	Single	AUS	CAN	FRA	UK	US Mod
1998	"A Perfect Day Elise"	83	15	70	25	33
1999	"The Wind"	—	—	—	29	—

== Certifications and sales ==
Region	Certification	Certified units/sales
France (SNEP)	Gold	100,000^{*}
United Kingdom (BPI)	Silver	60,000^{^}
United States	—	164,000
Summaries
Worldwide	—	500,000
^{*} Sales figures based on certification alone.^{^} Shipments figures based on certification alone.
