= Stories from the City, Stories from the Sea =

2000 studio album by PJ Harvey

Studio album by PJ Harvey
- Released: 23 October 2000
- Recorded: March–April 2000
- Studios: Linford Manor (Milton Keynes, England)
- Genre: Alternative rock
- Length: 47:25
- Label: Island
- Producers: Rob Ellis; Mick Harvey; PJ Harvey

PJ Harvey chronology
Is This Desire? (1998)	Stories from the City, Stories from the Sea (2000)	Uh Huh Her (2004)

Singles from Stories from the City, Stories from the Sea
- 1. "Good Fortune" Released: 13 November 2000; 2. "A Place Called Home" Released: 26 February 2001; 3. "This Is Love" Released: 8 October 2001

Stories from the City, Stories from the Sea is the fifth studio album by the English singer-songwriter PJ Harvey, released on 23 October 2000 by Island Records. Recorded during March to April 2000, it contains themes of love that are tied into Harvey's affection for New York City.

The album became the second major commercial success of her recording career, following her successful breakthrough To Bring You My Love (1995). Upon its release, the album received acclaim from most music critics and earned Harvey several accolades, including the 2001 Mercury Prize. It spent 17 weeks on the UK Albums Chart, and has been certified Platinum in the United Kingdom and Australia. It is generally regarded as one of her best works.

== Background and music ==
In 1998, while shooting a film as an actress for Hal Hartley in New York, she felt inspired by the city and wrote several songs. Some of them ended up on the record. In 1999, she chose to live there for nine months. However, she insisted in interviews it was not "my New York album". Songs were also written while she was in London or at home in Dorset. Stories from the City, Stories from the Sea was then recorded at Linford Manor in Milton Keynes in March – April 2000. The record was co-produced by Mick Harvey, Rob Ellis and Harvey, and mixed by Victor Van Vugt at the Fallout Shelter. The album featured a duet with Radiohead frontman Thom Yorke on the track "This Mess We're In", as well as backing vocals and keyboards from Yorke on the songs "One Line" and "Beautiful Feeling". She had met Yorke in 1992 and they had stayed in contact. She said: "I'd long been interested in the idea of somebody else singing a whole song on a record of mine, to have a very different dimension brought in by somebody else's voice. It adds so much dynamic within the record to have this other character coming in".

She wanted the record to be more direct: "It's very different musically to the first couple of albums. It's very melodic, and it's much rounder and fuller. The earlier albums were very black and white in some sense, very extreme. Melodically, this is much more sophisticated than those records. It kind of feels like a combination of every album I've made so far rolled into one." The songs were also a musical departure from her previous dark material. Harvey told Q in 2001, "I wanted everything to sound as beautiful as possible. Having experimented with some dreadful sounds on Is This Desire? and To Bring You My Love—where I was really looking for dark, unsettling, nauseous-making sounds—Stories from the City... was the reaction. I thought, No, I want absolute beauty. I want this album to sing and fly and be full of reverb and lush layers of melody. I want it to be my beautiful, sumptuous, lovely piece of work." She did, however, concede jokingly that it was only "pop according to PJ Harvey, which is probably as un-pop as you can get according to most people's standards."

Pitchfork compared her voice on the lead single "Good Fortune" to that of the Pretenders's Chrissie Hynde, while the Los Angeles Times observed: "Her singing often recalls Patti Smith and Siouxsie Sioux, artists who, like Harvey, project a sexuality derived from—yet never bound by—rock's male sensibilities."

== Release and commercial performance ==
The album was released on 24 October 2000, and promoted with a video for the lead single "Good Fortune", shot at night in streets of London. It reached number 23 on the UK Albums Chart. The album was certified Platinum in the UK, with sales over 300,000 copies. The album debuted at number 42 on the US Billboard 200 chart. As of 2003, it has sold 357,000 copies in United States according to Nielsen SoundScan. It has also been certified Gold in France, and has sold 1 million copies worldwide.

The album was reissued on vinyl in February 2021 as part of a comprehensive reissue campaign of Harvey's back catalogue. A collection of unreleased demos, titled Stories from the City, Stories from the Sea – Demos, was also released.

== Critical reception ==
Professional ratings
Aggregate scores
Source	Rating
Metacritic	88/100
Review scores
Source	Rating
AllMusic	4/5 stars
Chicago Sun-Times	3.5/4 stars
Entertainment Weekly	A−
Los Angeles Times	3.5/4 stars
NME	9/10
Pitchfork	5.5/10 (2000); 8.4/10 (2021)
Q	4/5 stars
Rolling Stone	4.5/5 stars
Spin	8/10
The Village Voice	A+

Stories from the City, Stories from the Sea received critical acclaim from music critics. At Metacritic, which assigns a normalised rating out of 100 to reviews from mainstream critics, the album received an average score of 88, based on 25 reviews. NME hailed it as "a magnificent, life-affirming opus" by Harvey. The Guardian also praised the album, stating “What makes this album so fascinating is the way Harvey toys with the ideas of femininity”. Robert Christgau called it "the best album of her career" in his review for Rolling Stone.

Other critics rated it as only average. Spencer Owen of Pitchfork viewed the album as lacking in distinction, saying "the sheen gets slicker and her music gets duller". The publication later, however, ranked it at number 124 in their "The Top 200 Albums of the 2000s" list in 2009. In 2021, they included it in their "Rescored" list, saying that they wished to change their original score of 5.4 to an 8.4.

=== Accolades ===
The album earned Harvey Brit Award nominations as Best British Female Artist for two years running, as well as two Grammy Award nominations for Best Rock Album and Best Female Rock Performance for the single "This Is Love".

For the album, Harvey was nominated for the 2001 Mercury Prize for the third time (her previous nominations were for Rid of Me and To Bring You My Love). The award ceremony was held on 11 September 2001. Harvey was in Washington, D.C., on that day and witnessed the terrorist attacks on the Pentagon from her hotel room window. She was announced as the winner and accepted her award by phone, saying "It has been a very surreal day. All I can say is thank you very much, I am absolutely stunned." The win made Harvey the first female solo artist to receive the Mercury Prize in the award's history.

The album was ranked number eight on Rolling Stone's list of the 50 Essential "Women in rock" Albums. In 2002, Q magazine named Stories from the City, Stories from the Sea the Greatest Album of All-Time by a Female Artist. In 2006, the album was chosen by Time as one of the 100 best albums of all time. In 2009, Pitchfork named the album the 124th Top Album of the 2000s. In 2009, NME also placed the album inside their Top 100 Greatest Albums of the Decade, at number six. The album was also included in the book 1001 Albums You Must Hear Before You Die. Rolling Stone named it the thirty-fifth best album of the decade. In 2019, the album was ranked 19th on The Guardian's 100 Best Albums of the 21st Century list. In the 2012 version of Rolling Stone's 500 Greatest Albums of All Time, it was ranked at number 431, then in the 2020 update, it was moved up to number 313.

Critical rankings for Stories from the City, Stories from the Sea
Publication	Type	Year	Rank	Ref.
Stylus Magazine	All-time	2004	116	
WXPN	All-time	2005	693	
Time	All-time	2010	--	
Rolling Stone	All-time	2012	431	
Rolling Stone	All-time	2020	313	
Entertainment Weekly	All-time	2012	86	
NME	All-time	2013	134	
Paste	All-time	2024	260	
"--" indicates an unordered list.

== Track listing ==
All tracks are written by PJ Harvey.

Stories from the City, Stories from the Sea – Standard edition
No.	Title	Length
1.	"Big Exit"	3:51
2.	"Good Fortune"	3:20
3.	"A Place Called Home"	3:43
4.	"One Line"	3:14
5.	"Beautiful Feeling"	4:00
6.	"The Whores Hustle and the Hustlers Whore"	4:01
7.	"This Mess We're In"	3:57
8.	"You Said Something"	3:19
9.	"Kamikaze"	2:24
10.	"This Is Love"	3:48
11.	"Horses in My Dreams"	5:38
12.	"We Float"	6:07
Total length:		47:25

Stories from the City, Stories from the Sea – Australia, UK and Japan bonus track
No.	Title	Length
13.	"This Wicked Tongue"	3:42

== Singles and promo videos ==
"Good Fortune"
"Good Fortune" by PJ Harvey

- "Good Fortune"
- "A Place Called Home"
- "This Is Love"/"You Said Something" (two versions)
- "You Said Something"

== Personnel ==
All personnel credits adapted from the album's liner notes.

Musicians

- PJ Harvey – vocals, guitar (1–3, 5–11), bass (1), keyboards (3, 4, 8, 10), piano (12), djembe (12), maracas (6), e-bow (12), producer, engineer
- Rob Ellis – drums (2, 3, 6–12), piano (2, 3, 7, 11, 12), tambourine (1, 8, 10), synthesizer (2), keyboards (12), bells (12), harpsichord (1), electric piano (2), vibraphone (4), background vocals (11, 12), producer
- Mick Harvey – organ (12), bass (2–4, 6–12), drums (1, 4), percussion (3), harmonium (1), keyboards (7, 9, 10), accordion (4), background vocals (11, 12), producer

Guest musicians

- Thom Yorke – vocals (4, 5, 7), keyboards (4)

Production

- Victor Van Vugt – engineer, mixing (1–11)
- Head – engineer, mixing (12)
- Howie Weinberg – mastering

Design

- Rob Crane – design
- Maria Mochnacz – design, photography

== Charts ==
=== Weekly charts ===
Weekly chart performance for Stories from the City, Stories from the Sea
Chart (2000-2001)	Peak position
Australian Albums (ARIA)	20
Austrian Albums (Ö3 Austria)	43
Belgian Albums (Ultratop Flanders)	35
Canada Top Albums/CDs (RPM)	37
Dutch Albums (Album Top 100)	42
European Albums (Music & Media)	16
Finnish Albums (Suomen virallinen lista)	31
French Albums (SNEP)	7
German Albums (Offizielle Top 100)	54
Irish Albums (IRMA)	17
Italian Albums (FIMI)	38
New Zealand Albums (RMNZ)	42
Norwegian Albums (VG-lista)	8
Scottish Albums (Official Charts)	28
Swedish Albums (Sverigetopplistan)	10
Swiss Albums (Schweizer Hitparade)	26
UK Albums (Official Charts)	23
US Billboard 200	42

2021 weekly chart performance for Stories from the City, Stories from the Sea
Chart (2021)	Peak position
Belgian Albums (Ultratop Flanders)	46
Belgian Albums (Ultratop Wallonia)	77
German Albums (Offizielle Top 100)	24
Portuguese Albums (AFP)	33
Scottish Albums (Official Charts)	8

=== Year-end charts ===
Year-end chart performance for Stories from the City, Stories from the Sea
Chart (2001)	Position
Australian Albums (ARIA)	87
UK Albums (OCC)	173

== Certifications and sales ==
Certifications and sales for Stories from the City, Stories from the Sea
Region	Certification	Certified units/sales
Australia (ARIA)	Platinum	70,000^{^}
Belgium (BRMA)	Gold	25,000^{*}
France (SNEP)	Gold	100,000^{*}
United Kingdom (BPI)	Platinum	316,529
United States	—	357,000
Summaries
Worldwide	—	1,000,000
^{*} Sales figures based on certification alone.^{^} Shipments figures based on certification alone.
