= Sheela-Na-Gig (song) =

Single by PJ Harvey

from the album Dry
- Released: 17 February 1992
- Recorded: November–December 1991
- Studio: The Icehouse (Yeovil, England)
- Genre: Alternative rock; indie rock; grunge
- Length: 3:13
- Label: Too Pure
- Songwriter(s): PJ Harvey
- Producer(s): Rob Ellis; PJ Harvey; Head

PJ Harvey singles chronology
"Dress" (1991)	"Sheela-Na-Gig" (1992)	"50ft Queenie" (1993)

"Sheela-Na-Gig" is a song by the English alternative rock singer-songwriter PJ Harvey, written by Harvey. The song was released as the second single from her debut studio album, Dry, in February 1992. The single was the second, and final, single from Dry and only single from the album to enter the charts in both the United Kingdom and United States. It peaked at number 9 on the Billboard Modern Rock Tracks chart, becoming one of Harvey's highest charting songs in the US. An accompanying music video, directed by Maria Mochnacz, was released alongside the single.

== Origin and recording ==
"Sheela-Na-Gig" was written in April 1990. The song's title is a reference to sheela na gig statues; figurative carvings of naked women displaying an exaggerated vulva found throughout Britain and Ireland. The album version of the song, as featured on Dry, was recorded at The Icehouse—a studio in Yeovil, England, also used by Jay Diggins and Automatic Dlamini, a band she was previously in with John Parish—as part of the album's recording sessions. This version was engineered by Head, produced by Head, Rob Ellis and PJ Harvey. A version, recorded for John Peel and produced and engineered by Mike Robinson and James Birwistle, was included on the compilation album The Peel Sessions 1991-2004, released in 2006.

== Composition ==
The lyrics to "Sheela-Na-Gig" make several allusions to sheela na gig statues in lyrics such as "look at these, my child-bearing hips," "you exhibitionist," and "put money in your idle hole". The lyrics narrate "imperious male demands and female self-loathing" and "a leather jacket-wearing rocker, black-humouring the boys with her twangy moan." The male character conveyed in the lyrics is uninterested in the female due to her exhibitionism and him not wanting to be "unclean." The lyric "dirty pillows" is a reference to the Stephen King novel Carrie, in which Margaret White uses the term to describe breasts. The repeated lyric, "I'm gonna wash that man right outa my hair" is the title of a song from the 1949 musical South Pacific.

Speaking of the song's inspiration and message, Harvey told Melody Maker in 1992, "I liked the image [of a sheela na gig] – the combination of pulling yourself apart and laughing at the same time – I wanted that sense of humour in the song. The song's a collection of different moments between lovers. I suppose it's about being able to laugh at yourself in relationships. There's some anger there but, for me, it's a funny song. I wasn't intending it to be a feminist songs or anything. I wanted it to have several sides." She added to NME, "The song isn't actually about a sheela na gig, I just used it as a starting point. The song itself is autobiographical, based on various experiences".

Musically, the song was composed in standard tuning. A capo is present on the first fret of Harvey's guitar in all versions of the song. The opening consists of four notes alternately played. The verse and the chorus feature the same two chords (Emaj-Gmaj) throughout, simplifying the structure. The change in structure is during the bridge ("put money in your idle hole") when the chords change (A5-F#5-A5-B5). The use of power chords is consistent with the alternative rock scene of the 1990s when other bands, such as Nirvana, were known for their use of them.

== Release ==
Three versions of the "Sheela-Na-Gig" single were released. The single was released in February 1992, four months prior to the release of its parent album, Dry, on Too Pure Records. The single was pressed on CD, 7" vinyl, and 12" vinyl with the CD and 12" vinyl singles featuring two Dry songs, "Hair" and "Joe", as b-sides. The 7" vinyl version omitted "Hair" and only 400 copies of it were pressed. In the United States, it entered and peaked Billboard's Alternative Songs at number 9, and in the United Kingdom it entered the UK Singles Chart at number 69, leaving the charts the following week.

== Critical reception ==
The song, like the Dry album, generated an overwhelmingly strong critical response. Keith Cameron of NME picked it as the magazine's "single of the week". He commented how Harvey "plots a tale of male weakness and fear in the face of female strength and beauty" and noted the song's "brittle, primitive riff that's reminiscent of both Patti Smith's 'Gloria' and the Pixies in its ruthlessly efficient dynamic", and Harvey's "curiously indefinable" voice and "adroit lyrical touch". Andrew Smith of Melody Maker stated, "Harvey would be an angry, man-eating hen, locked in its coop and poked with sticks by the sadistic pigs (us). Her edgy songs seem to suck the air out of a room, leaving behind only a claustrophobic haze, sometimes bordering on neurosis. My favourite tune here is on the B-side, "Hair", and it seethes with frustration and rage at PJ being denied something (someone) she wants. Intense stuff."

Z Magazine referred to the song as "most electrifying" and "constructs a sarcastic, aggressive sexual advance." In Entertainment Weekly, a review said that the song "redeems [Harvey's] disturbing subject matter with cathartic vocals and her own caustic guitar." AllMusic has praised the song highly, describing the dynamics of the song-writing as "outstanding, veering from a tensely whispered verse to a full-throttle chorus topped by a middle eight that explodes (twice) in righteous fury." The lyrical content of the song was also praised, describing them as "still startling; in the guise of a Celtic fertility symbol, Harvey recounts presenting her nude self to a potential lover only to be rebuffed in a brutally cruel manner" and referred to the final verse "as if a careless razor cut ended the song prematurely", summarizing that "Sheela-Na-Gig" is "a stunning three minutes, probably still her finest performance." In the September 1999 issue of Spin, it was listed at number two on The Top 20 Singles of the 1990s list.

== Music video ==
The music video for "Sheela-Na-Gig" was directed by Maria Mochnacz and T. Farthling in early 1992. The video opens with images of a handbag and women's shoes revolving in an orange-glowing picture frame. These images are repeated twice throughout the video; once during the middle, and again towards the end. The following scene uses religious imagery with a statue of Jesus Christ being shown alongside Polaroid prints. Abstract-shot footage of Harvey and her band performing the song live also incorporate large segments of the video, one video is shot in colour, the other in black and white. The live footage, at times, is overlaid with vivid images of lights and more Polaroids. Various other footage of close-up faces and sheela na gigs' vulvas are also shown.

== Track listing ==
All songs written by PJ Harvey unless otherwise noted.

CD single and 12" vinyl

1. "Sheela-Na-Gig" - 3:13
2. "Hair" - 3:38
3. "Joe" (Harvey, Rob Ellis) - 3:19

7" vinyl

1. "Sheela-Na-Gig" - 3:13
2. "Joe" (Harvey, Ellis) - 3:19

== Chart positions ==
Chart (1992)	Peak position
Billboard Alternative Songs	9
UK Singles Chart	69
