= Rid of Me =

Studio album by PJ Harvey
- Released: 26 April 1993
- Recorded: December 1992
- Studio: Pachyderm (Cannon Falls, Minnesota)
- Genres: Alternative rock; indie rock; punk blues; punk rock; grunge; post-punk; lo-fi
- Length: 48:02
- Label: Island
- Producer: Steve Albini

PJ Harvey chronology
Dry (1992)	Rid of Me (1993)	4-Track Demos (1993)

Singles from Rid of Me
- 1. "50ft Queenie" Released: 19 April 1993; 2. "Man-Size" Released: 5 July 1993

Rid of Me is the second studio album by the English singer-songwriter PJ Harvey, released on 26 April 1993 by Island Records, approximately one year after the release of her critically acclaimed debut studio album Dry (1992). It marked a departure from Harvey's previous songwriting, being more raw and aggressive than its predecessor.

The songs on Rid of Me were performed by Harvey's original trio, consisting of Harvey on guitar and vocals, Rob Ellis on drums and backing vocals, and Steve Vaughan on bass guitar. Most of the songs on the album were recorded by Steve Albini, and it was the last album they recorded as a trio before disbanding in late 1993. Rid of Me was met with critical acclaim, and is widely regarded as one of the greatest albums of the 1990s and of all time, ranking at number 153 on the 2020 version of Rolling Stone's 500 Greatest Albums of All Time (up from 406 on the list's previous edition).

== Background and history ==
Harvey's first two studio albums were recorded in quick succession and their histories intertwine. In October 1991, she released her debut single "Dress". She signed a recording contract with indie record label Too Pure and relocated to London with her bandmates. Almost immediately after the single's release, she began to receive serious positive attention from music critics in both the UK and United States. This led to several major record labels vying to sign her. Harvey was initially reluctant to sign to a major label fearing she might lose artistic control of her music, but eventually decided to sign with Island Records in February 1992. A month later, Too Pure released her debut studio album Dry, containing both "Dress" and "Sheela-Na-Gig", her second single. Island would later distribute Dry under its Indigo imprint.

The band toured extensively in the UK and US to support Dry. Harvey turned down an offer to play the Lollapalooza festival in the summer of 1992, but did play the Reading Festival that August. By this time, non-stop touring had begun to take its toll on Harvey's health. She suffered from what has been described as a nervous breakdown, brought on by a number of factors including exhaustion, poor eating habits, and the break-up of a relationship. Making matters worse, Central Saint Martins College of Art and Design, where she had been accepted for study, refused to hold her place for her any longer. She left her London apartment and retreated to her native Dorset. While recuperating in October 1992, she worked on the songs that would appear on Rid of Me.

== Music and lyrics ==
"Rid of Me"
The album's title track "ricochets violently between revenge fantasies and the desperate neediness of the backing chorus."

Structurally, Harvey continued to complicate her songwriting by utilising "strangely skewed time signatures and twisty song structures", resulting in songs that "tilt toward performance art".

The album's lyrics have been widely interpreted as being feminist in nature. Harvey, however, repeatedly denied a feminist agenda in her songwriting, stating "I don't even think of myself as being female half the time. When I'm writing songs I never write with gender in mind. I write about people's relationships to each other. I'm fascinated with things that might be considered repulsive or embarrassing. I like feeling unsettled, unsure." Some of the lyrics were inspired by her personal experiences. The title track, for instance, was admittedly influenced by one of Harvey's relationships coming to an end. When told by an interviewer that "Rid of Me" sounded psychotic, she replied that she wrote the song "at my illest" and added "I was almost psychotic" at the time. But, she made it clear that not all of the lyrics were to be read autobiographically, saying "I would have to be 40 and very worn out to have lived through everything I write about".

The album also includes a cover version of Bob Dylan's 1965 song "Highway 61 Revisited". Harvey's mother and father, both Dylan fans, had suggested that she record the track.

== Recording ==
In the late fall of 1992 the trio embarked on a short US tour. When the tour concluded in December they stayed in America to record their new album at the secluded Pachyderm Recording Studios in Cannon Falls, Minnesota. Harvey chose Chicago musician and sound engineer Steve Albini to record the album. Harvey had admired Albini's distinctively raw recordings of bands like Pixies, Slint, the Breeders and the Jesus Lizard.

The recording session took place over a two-week period, but according to Harvey the bulk of the recording was done in three days. Most of the songs were played live in the studio. Harvey spoke highly of Albini's recording, stating, "He's the only person I know that can record a drum kit and it sounds like you're standing in front of a drum kit. It doesn't sound like it's gone through a recording process or it's coming out of speakers. You can feel the sound he records, and that is why I wanted to work with him, 'cause all I ever wanted is for us to be recorded and to sound like we do when we're playing together in a room".

She also gave insight into his recording methods, saying "The way that some people think of producing is to sort of help you to arrange or contributing or playing instruments, he does none of that. He just sets up his microphones in a completely different way from which I've ever seen anyone set up mics before, and that was astonishing. He'd have them on the floor, on the walls, on the windows, on the ceiling, twenty feet away from where you were sitting... He's very good at getting the right atmosphere to get the best take."

The song "Man Size Sextet" was not recorded by Albini. It was instead produced by Harvey, Rob Ellis, and Head.

== Artwork ==
The cover of the album depicts Harvey topless and swinging her drenched hair into the air. The photo was captured by Harvey's friend and photographer Maria Mochnacz, and was taken in Mochnacz's bathroom in her flat in Bristol. Due to the small size of the room, she had to place her camera against the wall opposite Harvey and could not look through the camera's viewfinder. The photo was taken in total darkness and only illuminated by the split-second flash.

When the photo was delivered to Island Records, Mochnacz was told that the imperfections in the picture (such as the water drops on the wall and the house plant) could be removed. She protested this decision, responding, "It's supposed to be like that – It's part of the picture".

== Release and critical reception ==
Professional ratings
Review scores
Source	Rating
AllMusic	5/5 stars
Entertainment Weekly	D
Los Angeles Times	4/4 stars
Mojo	5/5 stars
NME	8/10
Pitchfork	10/10
Record Collector	5/5 stars
Rolling Stone	3/5 stars
The Rolling Stone Album Guide	4.5/5 stars
The Village Voice	A

Rid of Me was released on 26 April 1993 in the United Kingdom and on 4 May 1993 in the United States, and was met with widespread critical acclaim. Melody Maker raved that "No other British artist is so aggressively exploring the dark side of human nature, or its illogical black humour; no other British artist possesses the nerve, let alone the talent, to conjure up its soundtrack." Veteran UK disc jockey and radio presenter John Peel, a supporter of Harvey since the beginning of her career, added "You're initially so taken aback by what you're hearing. But you go back again and again and it implants itself on your consciousness." The San Francisco Chronicle called Harvey "A talent and a singular voice that demands to be heard." Evelyn McDonnell of Spin wrote that Harvey made it a point to "confound expectations and stereotypes".

"I was surprised at people's positive reaction to Rid of Me. I liked it but I thought it was a very...difficult album. I thought people who had the first album wouldn't like it."

— PJ Harvey

Steve Albini's production of the record proved controversial. Critics were divided over whether his recording complemented Harvey's voice or buried it. On the positive side, it was written that "Albini deftly balances heavy feedback and distortion with unexpected quiet breaks, making this release more musically diverse – and ultimately more satisfying – than PJ Harvey's debut." But others considered the recording too harsh, saying "Steve Albini's deliberately crude production leaves everything minimal and rough, as if the whole album were recorded in somebody's basement, with the drums set up in a bathroom to clatter as chaotically as possible." Another review called it simply "a trial to endure". Critic Stephen Thomas Erlewine tried to reconcile Albini's production with Harvey's songs. He admitted the album has a "bloodless, abrasive edge" that leaves "absolutely no subtleties in the music", but theorises that Albini's recordings "may be the aural embodiment of the tortured lyrics, and therefore a supremely effective piece of performance art, but it also makes Rid of Me a difficult record to meet halfway."

Harvey herself was pleased with the result. "I do everything for myself primarily," she said, "and I was happy with it. I don't really listen when people say good things about my work because I tend to not give myself praise about anything. But I was really pleased with Rid of Me. For that period of my life, it was perfect. Well, it wasn't perfect but as near to as I could get at that time". She remained friends with Albini afterward, finding in him a kindred spirit. "People read things in and make him what they want him to be," Harvey said. "He's the only other person I know that that happens to besides myself. People have a very specific idea of what I am – some kind of ax-wielding, man-eating Vampira – and I'm not that at all. I'm almost the complete opposite."

The album yielded two singles: "50ft Queenie" and "Man-Size". The music videos for both songs were directed by Maria Mochnacz. "50ft Queenie" was named a buzzworthy video by MTV in the Spring of 1993.

=== Legacy and impact ===
Rid of Me is regarded as an iconic album within alternative music. In 2016, Zach Schonfeld of Stereogum dubbed it not just one of the alternative era's "greatest [and] scariest rock albums," but that "of any era." In 2022, it was included on an Alternative Press list titled "20 albums that paved the way for alternative as we know it". The following year, Louder Sound's Emma Johnston saw that, in Rid of Me's wake, the genre's "host of uncompromised confessionals" drew inspiration from it.

Rid of Me has impacted and garnered admiration from various musicians in the years since its release. In 2005, Spin's Caryn Ganz saw that the way for the band Elastica and musician Karen O was paved by the album's "poetically demented blues".

Some of Harvey's peers have expressed their admiration for the album. Reflecting on her band Hole's second studio album Live Through This (1994) in a 2014 Spin interview, musician Courtney Love admitted to seeing Rid of Me as "a far superior record" compared to theirs. Kurt Cobain was an admirer of the album, and according to Steve Albini, who produced In Utero: "I sent them a copy of Rid of Me. Kurt told me very specifically that he thought Polly's voice was great on those recordings. He really liked the way her singing came across. He was a fan."

== Tour ==
Harvey and her band toured in the spring and summer of 1993 to support Rid of Me. The tour began in the UK in May and moved to America in June. Maria Mochnacz documented aspects of the tour, and her footage was used to create the long-form video Reeling with PJ Harvey (1994). Harvey's concert setlist drew from Dry and Rid of Me, but also highlighted songs that did not appear on either of those recordings. For example, she regularly performed a cover version of Willie Dixon's 1961 song "Wang Dang Doodle". One reviewer praised Harvey's version and called it "perhaps the definitive version of that song."

In August, they finished the tour with a string of dates opening for the Irish rock band U2 during their Zooropa tour. In the fall the trio started to disintegrate, first with the departure of Ellis and then Vaughan shortly afterward. By September, Harvey was performing as a solo artist.

== Accolades ==
Rid of Me entered the UK Albums Chart at number three and quickly went silver, and enjoyed a top-30 hit in the single "50 ft. Queenie". In the US it generated major college-radio airplay and expanded her growing fan base. It also won considerable critical acclaim and featured in various top ten album-of-the-year lists in respectable press, like The Village Voice, Spin, Melody Maker, Vox and Select. Spin gave it a rare ten out of ten review rating. Rid of Me was shortlisted for the 1993 Mercury Prize, but lost to Suede. If anything its critical stature has grown over the years—Rolling Stone selected it as one of the Essential Recordings of the 90s, and in 2005, Spin ranked it the ninth greatest album of 1985–2005 after it had ranked it only the 37th greatest album of the 90s after To Bring You My Love at number 3. In 2003, the album was ranked number 405 on Rolling Stone magazine's list of the 500 greatest albums of all time; the list's 2012 edition had it ranked 406th, and the 2020 version at number 153. In 2011, Slant Magazine ranked Rid of Me as the 25th greatest album of the 90s. In 2014, the album placed tenth on the Alternative Nation site's "Top 10 Underrated 90's Alternative Rock Albums" list. The title track was ranked number 194 on the 2021 version of Rolling Stone's 500 Greatest Songs of All Time.

== Track listing ==
All tracks are written by Polly Jean Harvey, except "Highway 61 Revisited", written by Bob Dylan. All tracks produced by Steve Albini, except "Man-Size Sextet", produced by PJ Harvey, Rob Ellis and Head.

Side one
No.	Title	Length
1.	"Rid of Me"	4:28
2.	"Missed"	4:25
3.	"Legs"	3:40
4.	"Rub 'til It Bleeds"	5:03
5.	"Hook"	3:57
6.	"Man-Size Sextet"	2:18
Total length:		23:51

Side two
No.	Title	Length
7.	"Highway 61 Revisited" (Bob Dylan cover)	2:57
8.	"50ft Queenie"	2:23
9.	"Yuri-G"	3:28
10.	"Man-Size"	3:16
11.	"Dry"	3:23
12.	"Me-Jane"	2:42
13.	"Snake"	1:36
14.	"Ecstasy"	4:26
Total length:		24:11 (48:02)

== Personnel ==
All personnel credits adapted from Rid of Me's liner notes.

PJ Harvey Trio

- PJ Harvey – vocals, guitar, organ, cello, violin, producer (6)
- Steve Vaughan – bass
- Rob Ellis – drums, percussion, backing vocals, arrangement, producer (6)

Technical

- Steve Albini – producer, engineering, mixing
- Head – producer, engineer (6)
- John Loder – mastering

Design

- Maria Mochnacz – photography

== Charts ==
1993 weekly chart performance for Rid of Me
Chart (1993)	Peak position
European Albums (Eurotipsheet)	18
UK Albums (Official Charts)	3
US Billboard 200	158
US Heatseekers Albums (Billboard)	10

2020 weekly chart performance for Rid of Me
Chart (2020)	Peak position
Belgian Albums (Ultratop Flanders)	190
Belgian Albums (Ultratop Wallonia)	115
German Albums (Offizielle Top 100)	58
Norwegian Vinyl Albums (VG-lista)	2
Scottish Albums (Official Charts)	20
Swiss Albums (Schweizer Hitparade)	43

=== Singles ===
Chart performance for singles from Rid of Me
Single (1993)	Peak positions
Single (1993)	UK
"50ft Queenie"	27
"Man-Size"	42

== Certifications ==
Certifications for Rid of Me
Region	Certification	Certified units/sales
United Kingdom (BPI)	Silver	200,000
United States	—	207,000
