= 4-Track Demos =

Demo album by PJ Harvey
- Released: 19 October 1993
- Recorded: 1991–1992
- Genre: Alternative rock; indie rock
- Length: 47:24
- Label: Island
- Producer: PJ Harvey

PJ Harvey chronology
Rid of Me (1993)	4-Track Demos (1993)	To Bring You My Love (1995)

4-Track Demos is an album of demos by the English singer-songwriter PJ Harvey. It was released on 19 October 1993 by Island Records. It consists of eight demos of songs from her previous studio album, Rid of Me, along with six demos of some unreleased tracks which never made it to release with the three-piece PJ Harvey line-up. According to interviews with Harvey, all fourteen of these songs were written and demoed at her home between mid-1991 and autumn 1992. 4-Track Demos was Harvey's first entirely self-produced album; there would not be another such until 2004's Uh Huh Her.

== Background ==
"Ecstasy"
"Ecstasy" audio sample

Prior to the release of 4-Track Demos, Harvey had a history of releasing early versions of her songs. The demo versions for the songs on her debut album Dry (1992) were released with the studio album in a limited edition double album format called Dry (Demonstration). She briefly contemplated releasing Rid of Me as a double album, consisting of the studio album on one disc and the demo versions on another. However, considering that Rid of Me was to be her major label debut, a double album ended up being a move that neither Harvey nor Island wanted to make.

Harvey explained the reason for releasing this record to Filter magazine in a 2004 interview: "4-Track Demos... was partly encouraged by Steve Albini [producer of Rid of Me]. He loved the demos for that album so much he thought they should be out there and I tended to agree with him. It seemed like showing another side of what I do and introducing new songs that I hadn't recorded on a record. It was a lovely thing to do and it felt like the right time because my three-piece band had fallen apart and I was kind of in limbo before deciding where I was gonna be going again. So, it was just like a small interjection piece of me before I knew where I was going to be next."

== Release and critical reception ==
Professional ratings
Review scores
Source	Rating
AllMusic	4/5 stars
Chicago Sun-Times	4/4 stars
Chicago Tribune	3.5/4 stars
Entertainment Weekly	A
Mojo	5/5 stars
NME	8/10
Rolling Stone	4/5 stars
The Rolling Stone Album Guide	3.5/5 stars
Uncut	4/5 stars
The Village Voice	B+

As of 2005, 4-Track Demos had sold 119,000 copies in the U.S. The album charted in both the United Kingdom and the United States upon its release, peaking at number 19 on the UK Albums Chart and number 10 on Billboard's Heatseeker Albums chart. Some reviewers preferred this version to Rid of Me, which they contended buried some of her vocal range and sonic experimentations under its noisy, in-your-face dynamics. For a side project, 4-Track Demos received remarkably high praise: Entertainment Weekly called it "a chillingly intimate peek into the fierce musical ethic of an independent and compelling voice", Melody Maker hailed it as "viciously aggressive music with no numbing narcotic qualities", while Rolling Stone said in its four-star review that "its depth, range and conceptual completeness make you wonder why Harvey even bothered with such conventions as a band or a producer in the first place". Spin found that Harvey's vocals "stun, especially on those cuts that got the Albini treatment" on Rid of Me. Robert Christgau, however, still preferred Rid of Me over 4-Track Demos.

In 1994, Island Records gave away the original Yamaha MT 2X 4-track recorder Harvey used to record 4-Track Demos as a promotion in issue 67 of Alternative Press magazine. The winner was announced on the weekend of 19 March 1994 on JBTV as seen on Fox Net and Channel America. The winner, Thomas Wells of Vinton, Virginia, was picked from over 500 entries. In conjunction with being announced on TV, Thomas' name and photo were published in the April 1994 extra edition (number 71) issue of AP Wiretapping Newsletter.

"Hardly Wait" is one of two PJ Harvey songs used in Kathryn Bigelow's 1995 film Strange Days (the other is "Rid of Me"). In the film it is sung by Juliette Lewis.

== Artwork ==
The photo on the album's cover was shot by Maria Mochnacz in June 1993 while Harvey was touring to support the album Rid of Me. It shows Harvey in lingerie and sunglasses, raising her arm and exposing her natural underarm. The picture was taken at the Watergate, in Washington, D.C. The black-and-white photo that appears on the back of the album (also by Mochnacz) depicts Harvey naked and wrapped in plastic sheeting. When speaking about the picture, Mochnacz remarked "I suggested Polly was now a product so we wrapped her up like one".

== Tour ==
PJ Harvey did not tour to promote 4-Track Demos. She had recently endured the break-up of the PJ Harvey trio and was contemplating the direction her next studio album would take. Some of the unreleased tracks, however, had been played live during the Rid of Me tour. "M-Bike", in particular, was included in many of those concerts and a live version can be found in the long-form video Reeling with PJ Harvey, released in 1994. When Harvey toured in 1995 to promote To Bring You My Love, she also included songs from 4-Track Demos. "Goodnight", for example, was used as the closing song for many of the shows on that tour. Additionally, "Goodnight" was performed on the music program The White Room, which aired on Channel 4 in 1995. This performance highlighted Harvey's use of stage props during that tour (she beat out the rhythm with a long stick of dowl) as well as the unique instrumentation of guitarist Joe Gore, who played the song's sliding guitar riff with a knife.

== Track listing ==
All tracks are written by PJ Harvey.

No.	Title	Length
1.	"Rid of Me"	3:42
2.	"Legs"	3:47
3.	"Reeling" (previously unreleased)	2:59
4.	"Snake"	1:56
5.	"Hook"	4:31
6.	"50ft Queenie"	2:48
7.	"Driving" (previously unreleased)	2:38
8.	"Ecstasy"	2:56
9.	"Hardly Wait" (previously unreleased)	2:48
10.	"Rub 'til It Bleeds"	5:10
11.	"Easy" (previously unreleased)	3:16
12.	"M-Bike" (previously unreleased)	2:43
13.	"Yuri-G"	3:53
14.	"Goodnight" (previously unreleased)	4:17
Total length:		47:00

== Charts ==
Chart (1993)	Peak position
UK Albums (OCC)	19
US Heatseekers Albums (Billboard)	10
Chart (2020)	Peak position
Scottish Albums (OCC)	66
