= Dry (album) =

Studio album by PJ Harvey
- Released: 30 March 1992
- Recorded: September–December 1991
- Studio: The Icehouse (Yeovil, England)
- Genre: Alternative rock; indie rock; blues rock; post-punk
- Length: 39:54
- Label: Too Pure
- Producer: Head; Rob Ellis; PJ Harvey

PJ Harvey chronology
Dry (1992)	Rid of Me (1993)

Singles from Dry
- 1. "Dress" Released: December 1991; 2. "Sheela-Na-Gig" Released: February 1992

Dry is the debut studio album by the English singer-songwriter PJ Harvey, released on 30 March 1992 by Too Pure. The album was recorded at The Icehouse, a local studio in Yeovil, England, and the tracks were performed by Harvey's eponymous trio. The first 5000 LPs and first 1000 CDs included demo versions of the album's tracks and Dry was subsequently released in the United States on Indigo Records. Both versions were released in 1992. Dry was reissued on vinyl and CD in July 2020: an 11-track companion album collecting all of the demos titled Dry – Demos was also released on vinyl as a stand-alone record.

== Background ==
Speaking to Filter magazine in 2004, Harvey said of her debut album: "Dry is the first chance I ever had to make a record and I thought it would be my last. So, I put everything I had into it. It was a very extreme record. It was a great joy for me to be able to make it. I never thought I'd have that opportunity, so I felt like I had to get everything on it as well as I possibly could, because it was probably my only chance. It felt very extreme for that reason."

Dress

"Water"
from Dry (1992)

== Reception ==
=== Critical response ===
Professional ratings
Review scores
Source	Rating
AllMusic	4.5/5 stars
Chicago Tribune	3.5/4 stars
Entertainment Weekly	A+
Los Angeles Times	3.5/4 stars
NME	9/10
Pitchfork	9.2/10
Q	4/5 stars
The Rolling Stone Album Guide	3.5/5 stars
Select	4/5
The Village Voice	A−

Upon its release Dry received critical acclaim. In a nine-out-of-ten review for NME, critic Andrew Collins called the album a collection of "clever, repetitive, low-slung guitar poems" and said "Polly dredges these sounds from the pit of her dissected soul and drags them out of her mouth with clenched fists." Chicago Tribune reviewer Greg Kot referred to Dry as "jagged, lacerating and sexy in a disorienting sort of way" and likened the album to Broken English (1979) by Marianne Faithfull and Horses (1975) by Patti Smith; Kot awarded the album three-and-a-half-out-of-four stars, further stating "the best band out of the U.K. at the moment isn't another My Bloody Valentine guitar clone". Writing for Entertainment Weekly, Bill Wyman described Dry as a "scorching portrait of the dark side of the female psyche" and an "uncompromising work of exhilarating, cauterizing beauty", awarding it an A+ rating. Los Angeles Times reviewer Robert Hilburn gave Dry a three-and-a-half-out-of-four-star rating, writing that it "falls somewhere in between … an instant classic [and] a seductive calling card that signals the arrival of an extraordinary new artist." Critic Robert Christgau in his Village Voice column described Dry as a "cloudy but essential feminist distinction between egoist bullroar and honest irrational outpouring", rating the album an A−.

Retrospective reviews of Dry have also been largely positive. AllMusic editor Stephen Thomas Erlewine summarised the album as "a forceful collection of brutally emotional songs, highlighted by Harvey's deft lyricism and startling voice, as well as her trio's muscular sound" in a four-and-a-half-out-of-five-star review. Writing for Pitchfork, Laura Snapes said Dry "is a volcano and the scorched earth surrounding it, ripped with landsliding guitars, cowpunk mania, twisted blues, profound extremes, and power chords that hit like boulders dropped from on high." The fourth edition of The Rolling Stone Album Guide, published in 2004, awarded the album a three-and-a-half-out-of-five-star rating, with Christian Hoard writing that its songs equalled "anything the hair-flailing grunge boys could deliver."

=== Commercial performance ===
Dry peaked on the UK Albums Chart at number 11, remaining on the chart for a total of five weeks. A month prior to the album's release, its second single, "Sheela-Na-Gig", had peaked at number 69 on the UK Singles Chart. Despite Dry's critical success in the United States the album did not chart on any mainstream or independent Billboard chart, however, "Sheela-Na-Gig" peaked at number 9 on the Billboard Modern Rock Tracks chart in September 1992.

Dry was certified Silver by the British Phonographic Industry (BPI) in March 2005 after shipments of 60,000 copies. According to Nielsen SoundScan, the album had sold 176,000 copies in the US as of December 2005.

=== Accolades ===
In 1992 Dry was featured in several publications' year-end best-of lists. It placed at number 12 in Select's list of the best albums of the year, number 18 in Spin's "20 Best Albums of 1992" list, and was also featured in Q's "Recordings of the Year" feature.

Dry has since been featured on several best-of-all-time lists. It was ranked number 70 on Rolling Stone's list of the "100 Best Debut Albums of All Time" and number 151 on NME's "500 Greatest Albums of All Time" list. Dry is also included in the book 1001 Albums You Must Hear Before You Die.

== Track listing ==
All lyrics are written by PJ Harvey; all music is composed by Harvey, except where noted.

No.	Title	Music	Length
1.	"Oh My Lover"		3:57
2.	"O Stella"		2:36
3.	"Dress"		3:16
4.	"Victory"		3:16
5.	"Happy and Bleeding"		4:50
6.	"Sheela-Na-Gig"		3:11
7.	"Hair"		3:45
8.	"Joe"	Harvey, Rob Ellis	2:33
9.	"Plants and Rags"	Harvey, Ellis	4:09
10.	"Fountain"		3:52
11.	"Water"		4:32
Total length:			39:54

1992 limited-edition Demonstration CD bonus tracks
No.	Title	Music	Length
12.	"Oh My Lover" (Demo version, 1991)		2:30
13.	"O Stella" (Demo version, 1991)		3:16
14.	"Dress" (Demo version, 1991)		3:17
15.	"Victory" (Demo version, 1991)		4:19
16.	"Happy and Bleeding" (Demo version, 1991)		4:44
17.	"Sheela-Na-Gig" (Demo version, 1991)		3:15
18.	"Hair" (Demo version, 1991)		3:37
19.	"Joe" (Demo version, 1991)	Harvey, Ellis	3:16
20.	"Plants and Rags" (Demo version, 1991)	Harvey, Ellis	3:32
21.	"Fountain" (Demo version, 1991)		3:05
22.	"Water" (Demo version, 1991)		4:32
Total length:			78:55

== Personnel ==
All personnel credits adapted from Dry's album notes.

PJ Harvey Trio

- PJ Harvey – vocals, guitar, violin
- Steve Vaughan – bass
- Rob Ellis – drums, vocals, harmonium

Additional musicians

- Ian Olliver – bass (3, 5)
- Ben Groenevelt – double bass (3)
- Mike Paine – guitar (9)
- Chas Dickie – cello (9)

Technical personnel

- Head – production, engineering
- PJ Harvey – production
- Rob Ellis – production, mixing (5)
- Mark Vernon – production (3, 5)

Design personnel

- Foothold – layout
- Maria Mochnacz – photography

== Charts ==
Chart (1992)	Peak position
UK Albums (OCC)	11

Chart (2001)	Peak position
French Albums (SNEP)	149

Chart (2020)	Peak position
Norwegian Vinyl Albums (VG-lista)	3

== Certifications ==
Region	Certification	Certified units/sales
United Kingdom (BPI)	Silver	60,000^{^}
^{^} Shipments figures based on certification alone.
