= Uh Huh Her (album) =

Studio album by PJ Harvey
- Released: 31 May 2004
- Recorded: 2002–2003
- Genres: Alternative rock; punk blues; folk rock; lo-fi
- Length: 40:41
- Label: Island
- Producer: PJ Harvey

PJ Harvey chronology
Stories from the City, Stories from the Sea (2000)	Uh Huh Her (2004)	The Peel Sessions 1991–2004 (2006)

Singles from Uh Huh Her
- 1. "The Letter" Released: 17 May 2004; 2. "You Come Through" Released: 19 July 2004; 3. "Shame" Released: 20 September 2004

Uh Huh Her is the sixth studio album by the English alternative rock musician PJ Harvey, released on 31 May 2004 by Island Records. The album was written, recorded and produced over a two-year period by the singer-songwriter herself. She also played every instrument on the album (the first such project since 4-Track Demos in 1993) with the exception of the final drum tracks, added by long-time collaborator Rob Ellis.

During the accompanying tour that lasted eight months, she performed the album's unreleased title-track. Uh Huh Her debuted and peaked at number 12 in the UK Albums Chart and has been certified Silver by the BPI. It became Harvey's highest-charting album to date in the U.S., peaking at number 29 in the Billboard 200, and had sold more than 135,000 copies there as of 2005, according to AskBillboard. Although it charted higher than Stories from the City, Stories from the Sea in many territories, Uh Huh Her failed to achieve its predecessor's chart longevity and crossover interest.

The album received largely positive reviews upon its release, although there was some criticism of its production. It currently holds a 79 out of 100 metascore at Metacritic based upon 28 reviews, indicating "generally favorable reviews". At the 47th Grammy Awards, Uh Huh Her was nominated for Best Alternative Music Album.

== History ==
The album was written and recorded over a two-year period in Dorset, East Devon and Los Angeles. Much of the recording was done alone by Harvey using her four-track and eight-track home studio, guitar, keyboards and drum machine. For the first time since 1993's 4-Track Demos album, she produced it herself and played every instrument bar the final drum tracks, which were handled by her longtime collaborator Rob Ellis. Final recording and mixing was done by Head at the Presshouse Studio in rural East Devon in autumn/winter 2003.

Harvey told Mojo magazine, "I don't think 'tender' is a word that could be applied to anything I've written before, but that's how I feel about this album and I'm really pleased about it. Some of the songs are very gentle, very loving; with others I had a lot of fun in the words I used and the way I sang them." She explained to Time Out magazine how she "wanted to get back to the earthy, rootsy, more dirty side of things" following the popular success of her last album, 2000's Stories from the City, Stories from the Sea. She said, "I wanted this record to be simple, I wanted it to be ugly in some places, I wanted it to have a swagger to it... but also a real honesty and intimacy. I wanted a warmness and closeness and I wanted to make a welcoming record." To Spin magazine she said that, in contrast to the extreme darkness of some of her earlier LPs, "I find an enormous amount of openness and hope on this record... "The Desperate Kingdom of Love" or "You Come Through" I find incredibly optimistic and tender." Harvey also explained to Tracks magazine that, "I was looking for distressed, debased sounds. So all of the guitars are either tuned so low that it's hard to detect what notes they're playing or they're baritone guitars or they're played through the shittiest amps I could find."

On the inside sleeve of the album cover are a long set of self-portrait photographs that Harvey took over the years, and a series of scribbled annotations she collected during the songwriting process of Uh Huh Her – notes to herself such as "Scare yourself", "Too normal? Too PJ H?" and "All that matters is my voice and my story" (a piece of advice given to her by her friend Elvis Costello). She admitted to Shaken Stir that producing the record on her own was "a completely draining, disorientating, exasperating, invigorating experience" and "one of the hardest pieces of work I've ever done... I couldn't say that this record was an enjoyable experience. I think it was a journey that I learnt an enormous amount from, but certainly there were very enjoyable moments... I mean when I look back on it now it was a very difficult, hard and taxing time, and yet I'm so glad I did it – so glad."

Harvey underwent an eight-month world tour in support of the album with drummer Rob Ellis and two new bandmates, bass player Simon "Ding" Archer and guitarist Josh Klinghoffer. The tour was captured for the DVD On Tour: Please Leave Quietly.

A song called "Uh Huh Her" was regularly played during the tour, but not included on the album. It was eventually recorded for the digital compilation iTunes Originals – PJ Harvey. On the origin of album's title PJ Harvey mentioned it in Rolling Stone in 2004: "But it came from the chorus of a song, actually — there’s a song called “Uh Huh Her” that I play live but I chose never to record. The chorus is: “Don't marry uh huh her/Don't marry her her her.”"

== Critical reception ==
Professional ratings
Aggregate scores
Source	Rating
Metacritic	79/100
Review scores
Source	Rating
AllMusic	4/5 stars
Entertainment Weekly	A
The Guardian	3/5 stars
The Independent	4/5 stars
Los Angeles Times	4/4 stars
NME	5/10
Pitchfork	7.6/10
Q	4/5 stars
Rolling Stone	3.5/5 stars
Spin	B+

Uh Huh Her was released in May 2004 in the UK and peaked at #12 in the UK Albums Chart. The album was preceded by lead single "The Letter", which reached #28 in the UK Singles Chart. Uh Huh Her became PJ Harvey's highest-charting record on the US Billboard charts, reaching #29. Overall, however, it did not spark the same level of crossover interest as its million-selling predecessor Stories from the City, Stories from the Sea. As usual with Harvey, the critical reception was generally strong: Alternative Press described the record as "profoundly moving", Entertainment Weekly called it "raw, dark and beautiful... a jagged, edgy winner", and Time noted that "No singer since Janis Joplin has moved as easily between primal scream and intimate sigh". The Sunday Times hailed it as "a thrilling, bone-rattling barrage, interleaved with moments of hushed, accordion-flecked intimacy whose closeness and apparent candour make you want to shield yourself from their passion." Hot Press magazine, meanwhile, felt it was "an extremely potent record... that contains more perspectives, characters and camera angles than maybe any PJ album to date". It won Harvey her sixth BRIT Award nomination, as Best British Female Artist, and her fifth Grammy Award nomination, for Best Alternative Music Performance of 2004.

=== Accolades ===
Publication	Accolade	Year	Rank	Ref.
Spin	Top 40 Best Albums of the 2004	2004	31	

== Track listing ==
All tracks are written by PJ Harvey.

Uh Huh Her – Standard edition
No.	Title	Length
1.	"The Life and Death of Mr. Badmouth"	4:51
2.	"Shame"	2:32
3.	"Who the Fuck?"	2:09
4.	"Pocket Knife"	3:41
5.	"The Letter"	3:19
6.	"The Slow Drug"	3:22
7.	"No Child of Mine"	1:05
8.	"Cat on the Wall"	3:00
9.	"You Come Through"	2:46
10.	"It's You"	4:12
11.	"The End"	1:21
12.	"The Desperate Kingdom of Love"	2:42
13.	"Seagulls"	1:08
14.	"The Darker Days of Me & Him"	4:35
Total length:		40:41

"The Slow Drug"
"The Slow Drug" by PJ Harvey

== Personnel ==
Credits adapted from Uh Huh Her's liner notes.

- PJ Harvey – vocals, guitars, bass, piano, melodica, accordion, autoharp, producer, engineer, mixing, photography
- Rob Ellis – drums, percussion, backing vocals (3)
- Head – backing vocals (3, 5), engineer, mixing
- Evelyn Isaac – backing vocals (7, 14)

Technical

- Maria Mochnacz – artwork
- Rob Crane – artwork

== Charts ==
=== Weekly charts ===
Chart (2004)	Peak position
Australian ARIA Albums Chart	14
Austrian Top 40	33
Belgian Albums Chart (Vl)	16
Belgian Albums Chart (Wa)	31
Danish Albums Chart	11
Dutch Top 100	23
Finnish Albums Chart	14
French SNEP Albums Chart	10
German Albums Chart	36
Irish Albums Chart	10
Italian FIMI Albums Chart	17
Norwegian Albums Chart	6
Portuguese AFP Albums Chart	17
Swedish Albums Chart	14
Swiss Hitparade Albums Chart	17
UK Albums Chart	12
US Billboard 200	29
US Billboard Internet Albums	29

=== Singles ===
Year	Single	Peak positions		
Year	Single	UK	FRA	IRL
2004	"The Letter"	28	73	46
2004	"You Come Through"	41	—	—
2004	"Shame"	45	—	—
"—" denotes a release that did not chart.

== Certifications ==
Region	Certification	Certified units/sales
United Kingdom (BPI)	Silver	60,000^{^}
United States	—	135,000
^{^} Shipments figures based on certification alone.
