= Dress (PJ Harvey song) =

Single by PJ Harvey

from the album Dry
- Released: December 1991
- Recorded: Autumn 1991
- Studio: The Icehouse (Yeovil, England)
- Genre: Indie rock
- Length: 3:18
- Label: Too Pure
- Songwriters: PJ Harvey; Rob Ellis
- Producers: Rob Ellis; Mark Vernon; PJ Harvey

PJ Harvey singles chronology
"Dress" (1991)	"Sheela-Na-Gig" (1992)

Music video
- "Dress" on YouTube

Audio sample
- file; help

"Dress" is the debut single by English singer-songwriter PJ Harvey from her debut album Dry. Released in 1991, two promotional music videos were also recorded.

== Background and history ==
"Dress" was recorded at The Icehouse studio in Yeovil, England, as part of the Dry sessions. The song, like the album, generated an overwhelmingly strong critical response, though the song failed to chart.

The lyrics tell the story of a woman who's trying to impress a certain man with a dress ("Must be a way that I can dress to please him"). She finds the dress pretty uncomfortable ("It's hard to walk in the dress, it's not easy/I'm spilling over like a heavy loaded fruit tree"), but she's hoping it will help her too ("Close up my eyes/Dreamy dreamy music make it be alright").

At the end of the song, the man doesn't appreciate the dress ("'You purdy thang', my man says,/But I bought you beautiful dresses.") and she falls on the floor, causing big embarrassment on her. ("I'm falling flat and my arms are empty/Clear the way better get it out of this room").

== Track listing ==
All songs written by PJ Harvey, unless where noted.

UK CD and 12" single (Too Pure, PURE CD/5)

1. "Dress" (PJ Harvey, Rob Ellis) – 3:18
2. "Water" – 4:35
3. "Dry" – 3:36

== Music video ==
The music video for "Dress" was directed by Harvey's friend Maria Mochnacz, who would direct numerous videos for Harvey and design album and single art for her later in her career. It was the first video Mochnacz ever shot and as she and Harvey were short on money they could only afford to buy and process 12 minutes of film. As a result of this, some parts of the video are repeated and played backwards. The video was shot in black and white on a 16mm Bolex Camera in a circus school in Bristol called 'Fooltime', and consists of Harvey lying on the floor as a giant ballerina stencil is assembled in stop motion around her, as well as Harvey spinning in a dress and a body double swinging from a trapeze.

== Critical reception ==
Upon its release, NME picked "Dress" as their single of the week. John Peel, as a guest reviewer, commented, "I like the urgency of it, the way it keeps pushing along. I can't describe this guitar solo accurately but I think it's spot on. Gratifyingly genre-free." Stuart Maconie added that it was an "excellent, bristling recording" which "thumps along bravely with an engaging mixture of agitation and glee". David Stubbs of Melody Maker considered Harvey to be "the West Country's answer to Kristin Hersh". He noted the "acoustic, oppressive viola" and "demented one-note electric guitar" in "Dress" and added that the "more desolate" "Water" is "obsessive, neurotic, [and] driven by a sort of mental lust".
