= A Perfect Day Elise =

Single by PJ Harvey

from the album Is This Desire?
- Released: September 1998
- Genre: Alternative rock; art rock
- Length: 3:08
- Label: Island
- Songwriter: PJ Harvey
- Producers: Flood; Steve Osborne; PJ Harvey

PJ Harvey singles chronology
"That Was My Veil" (1995)	"A Perfect Day Elise" (1998)	"The Wind" (1999)

Music video
- "A Perfect Day Elise" on YouTube

"A Perfect Day Elise" is a song by English alternative rock musician PJ Harvey. Written solely by Harvey, the song was released as the lead single from her fourth studio album, Is This Desire? (1998), in September 1998 through Island Records. The song became Harvey's highest charting single in the United Kingdom, peaking at number 25. It also charted at number 33 on the US Billboard Modern Rock Tracks, becoming one of Harvey’s biggest US hits. An accompanying music video for the song, directed by Harvey's frequent collaborator Maria Mochnacz, was released in 1998.

== Background and reception ==
Similar to the other songs on Is This Desire?, "A Perfect Day Elise" narrates individual portrait of a female protagonist, named "Elise" in the song. According to the authors of Disruptive Divas: Feminism, Identity and Popular Music, Lori Burns and Melisse Lafrance, Harvey's vocals are recorded "with the effect that she is enclosed, while her voice is also layered with an octave doubling."

On his review for Is This Desire?, James Oldham of NME wrote that the song "will provide you with some idea of what's to come, but even its rumbling momentum and overloaded percussion is no preparation for the brutality of some of the material here." on his review for The New York Times, Robert Christgau described the song as "the uptempo single" off the album; nevertheless he also stated that the song "rocks to nowhere". Paul Verna of Billboard compared the song to other contemporary U2 tracks that were also produced by Flood.

== Track listing ==
UK CD single (CID 718)

1. "A Perfect Day Elise" – 3:12
2. "The Northwood" – 1:57
3. "Sweeter Than Anything" – 3:11

UK CD single (CIDX 718)

1. "A Perfect Day Elise" – 3:12
2. "The Bay" – 3:14
3. "Instrumental #3" – 1:02

UK 7"

1. "A Perfect Day Elise" – 3:08
2. "Sweeter Than Anything" – 3:11
3. "Instrumental #3" – 1:03

US promo CD

1. "A Perfect Day Elise (Single Version)" – 3:03
2. "A Perfect Day Elise (Research Hook)" – 0:10

== Charts ==
Chart (1998)	Peak position
Australian ARIA Singles Chart	83
Canada Rock/Alternative (RPM)	14
French Singles Charts	70
UK Singles Chart	25
US Billboard Modern Rock Tracks	33
Europe (Eurochart Hot 100)	71
