= PJ Harvey =

English musician (born 1969)

PJ Harvey MBE
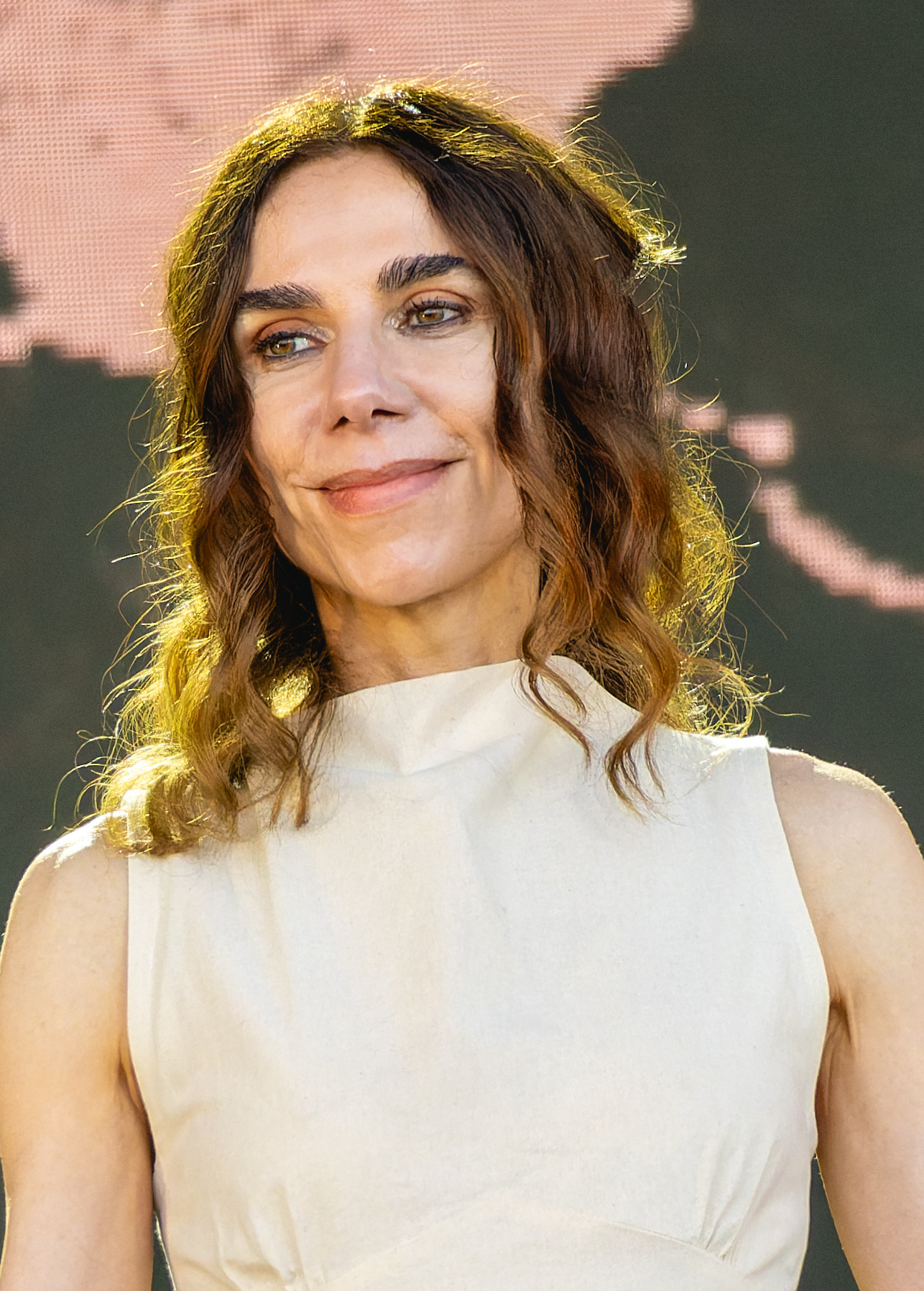
- Harvey in 2024

Background information
- Also known as: PJ Harvey
- Born: Polly Jean Harvey; 9 October 1969 (age 57); Bridport, Dorset, England
- Origin: Yeovil, Somerset, England
- Genres: Alternative rock; punk blues; art rock; indie rock; folk rock; avant-rock; grunge; punk rock
- Occupations: Singer; songwriter
- Instruments: Vocals; guitar; saxophone; keyboards; autoharp; percussion
- Works: PJ Harvey discography
- Years active: 1988–present
- Labels: Too Pure; Indigo; Island; Vagrant; Partisan
- Member of: Automatic Dlamini; The PJ Harvey band
- Website: pjharvey.net

Polly Jean Harvey (born 9 October 1969) is an English singer and songwriter. Primarily known as a vocalist and guitarist, she is also proficient with a wide range of instruments.

Harvey began her career in 1988 when she joined local band Automatic Dlamini as a vocalist, guitarist and saxophonist. The band's frontman, John Parish, is still her long-term collaborator. In 1991, she formed a trio called PJ Harvey and this began her career as PJ Harvey. The trio released two studio albums called Dry (1992) and Rid of Me (1993) before disbanding, after which Harvey continued as a solo artist. Since 1995, she has released a further ten studio albums with collaborations from various musicians including Parish, former bandmate Rob Ellis, Mick Harvey, and Eric Drew Feldman, and has also worked extensively with record producer Flood.

Among the accolades Harvey has received are both the 2001 and 2011 Mercury Prize for Stories from the City, Stories from the Sea (2000) and Let England Shake (2011), respectively, making her the only artist to have been awarded the prize twice. She has also received a BAFTA Award, eight Brit Award nominations, eight Grammy Award nominations and two further Mercury Prize nominations. Rolling Stone awarded her three accolades: 1992's Best New Artist and Best Singer Songwriter, and 1995's Artist of the Year. She was awarded for Outstanding Contribution to Music at the NME Awards. In the 2013 Birthday Honours, she was appointed a Member of the Order of the British Empire (MBE) for services to music.

== Early life ==
Polly Jean Harvey was born on 9 October 1969 in Bridport, Dorset, the second child of Ray and Eva Harvey (née Waters). Her parents owned a quarrying business on Ham Hill, the site of a large Iron Age hillfort, and she grew up on the family farm in Corscombe. During her childhood, she attended Beaminster School in nearby Beaminster, where she received guitar lessons from folk singer-songwriter Steve Knightley. Her parents introduced her to music that would later influence her work, including blues, Captain Beefheart and Bob Dylan. Her parents were avid music fans and regularly arranged get-togethers and small gigs, counting Ian Stewart among their oldest friends.

As a teenager, Harvey began learning saxophone and joined an eight-piece instrumental group, Bologne, run by composer Andrew Dickson. She was also a guitarist with folk duo the Polekats, with whom she wrote some of her earliest material. After finishing school, she joined Yeovil College and attended a visual arts foundation course.

== Career ==
=== Automatic Dlamini: 1988–1991 ===
In July 1988, Harvey became a member of Automatic Dlamini, a band based in Bristol with whom she gained extensive ensemble-playing experience. Formed by John Parish in 1983, the band consisted of a rotating line-up that at various times included Rob Ellis and Ian Oliver. Harvey had met Parish in 1987 through mutual friend Jeremy Hogg, the band's slide guitarist. Providing saxophone, guitars and backing vocals, she travelled extensively during the band's early days, including performances in East and West Germany, Spain and Poland to support the band's debut studio album, The D is for Drum. A second European tour took place throughout June and July 1989. Following the tour, the band recorded Here Catch, Shouted His Father, their second studio album, between late 1989 and early 1990. This is the only Automatic Dlamini material to feature Harvey, but remains unreleased, although bootleg versions of the album are in circulation.

In January 1991, Harvey left to form her own band with former bandmates Ellis and Oliver, though she had also formed lasting personal and professional relationships with other members, especially Parish, to whom she has referred as her "musical soulmate". Parish would subsequently contribute to, and sometimes co-produce, Harvey's solo studio albums and has toured with her several times. As a duo, Parish and Harvey have recorded two collaborative albums where Parish composed the music and Harvey wrote the lyrics. Parish's girlfriend in the late 1980s was photographer Maria Mochnacz. She and Harvey became close friends and Mochnacz went on to shoot and design most of Harvey's album artwork and music videos, contributing significantly to her public image.

Harvey said of her time with Automatic Dlamini: "I ended up not singing very much but I was just happy to learn how to play the guitar. I wrote a lot during the time I was with them but my first songs were crap. I was listening to a lot of Irish folk music at the time, so the songs were folky and full of penny whistles and stuff. It was ages before I felt ready to perform my own songs in front of other people." She also credits Parish for teaching her how to perform in front of audiences, saying "after the experience with John's band and seeing him perform I found it was enormously helpful to me as a performer to engage with people in the audience, and I probably did learn that from him, amongst other things."

Harvey wrote to the American rock band Slint after they printed a request for female singers on the sleeve of their 1991 album Spiderland, but Slint broke up before the album was released.

=== PJ Harvey Trio; Dry and Rid of Me: 1991–1994 ===
Harvey decided to name her new band the PJ Harvey Trio, rejecting other names as "nothing felt right at all or just suggested the wrong type of sound", and also to allow her to continue music as a solo artist. The trio consisted of Harvey on vocals and guitar, Ellis on drums and backing vocals, and Oliver on bass. Oliver later departed to rejoin the still-active Automatic Dlamini. He was subsequently replaced with Steve Vaughan. The trio's "disastrous" debut performance was held at a skittle alley in Charmouth Village Hall in April 1991. Harvey later recounted the event saying: "we started playing and I suppose there was about fifty people there, and during the first song we cleared the hall. There was only about two people left. And a woman came up to us, came up to my drummer, it was only a three piece, while we were playing and shouted at him 'Don't you realise nobody likes you! We'll pay you, you can stop playing, we'll still pay you!'" The group relocated to London in June 1991 when Harvey applied to study sculpture, still undecided as to her future career. During this time, the group recorded a set of demo songs and distributed them to record labels. Independent label Too Pure agreed to release the band's debut single "Dress" in October 1991, and later signed PJ Harvey. "Dress" received mass critical acclaim upon its release and was voted Single of the Week in Melody Maker by guest reviewer John Peel, who admired "the way Polly Jean seems crushed by the weight of her own songs and arrangements, as if the air is literally being sucked out of them ... admirable if not always enjoyable." However, Too Pure provided little promotion for the single and critics claim that "Melody Maker had more to do with the success of the 'Dress' single than Too Pure Records." A week after its release, the band recorded a live radio session for Peel on BBC Radio 1 on 29 October featuring "Oh, My Lover", "Victory", "Sheela-Na-Gig" and "Water".

The following February, the trio released "Sheela-Na-Gig" as their equally-acclaimed second single and their debut studio album, Dry (1992), followed in March. Like the singles preceding it, Dry received an overwhelming international critical response. The album was cited by Kurt Cobain of Nirvana as his sixteenth-favourite album ever in his posthumously published Journals (2002). Rolling Stone also named Harvey as Songwriter of the Year and Best New Female Singer. A limited edition double LP version of Dry was released alongside the regular version of the album, containing both the original and demo versions of each track, called Dry Demonstration, and the band also received significant coverage at the Reading Festival in 1992.

Island (PolyGram) signed the trio amid a major label bidding war in mid-1992, and in December 1992 the trio travelled to Cannon Falls, Minnesota, in the United States to record the follow-up to Dry with producer Steve Albini. Prior to recording with Albini, the band recorded a second session with John Peel on 22 September and recorded a version of Bob Dylan's "Highway 61 Revisited", and two new songs "Me Jane" and "Ecstasy". The recording sessions with Albini took place at Pachyderm Recording Studio and resulted in the band's major label debut Rid of Me in May 1993. Rolling Stone wrote that it "is charged with aggressive eroticism and rock fury. It careens from blues to goth to grunge, often in the space of a single song." The album was promoted by two singles, "50ft Queenie" and "Man-Size", as well as tours of the United Kingdom in May and of the United States in June, continuing there during the summer.

"Rid of Me"
The album's title track "ricochets violently between revenge fantasies and the desperate neediness of the backing chorus."

However, during the American leg of the tour, internal friction started to form between the members of the trio. Deborah Frost, writing for Rolling Stone, noticed "an ever widening personal gulf" between the band members, and quoted Harvey as saying "It makes me sad. I wouldn't have got here without them. I needed them back then – badly. But I don't need them anymore. We all changed as people." Despite the tour's personal downsides, footage from live performances was compiled and released on the long-form video Reeling with PJ Harvey (1993). The band's final tour was to support the Irish rock band U2 in August 1993, after which the trio officially disbanded. In her final appearance on American television in September 1993 on The Tonight Show with Jay Leno, Harvey performed a solo version of "Rid of Me". As Rid of Me sold substantially more copies than Dry, 4-Track Demos, a compilation album of demos for the album was released in October and inaugurated her career as a solo artist. In early 1994, it was announced that U2's manager, Paul McGuinness, had become her manager.

=== To Bring You My Love and Is This Desire?: 1995–1999 ===
As Harvey embarked on her solo career, she explored collaborations with other musicians. In 1995 she released her third studio album, To Bring You My Love, featuring former bandmate John Parish, Bad Seeds multi-instrumentalist Mick Harvey and French drummer Jean-Marc Butty, all of whom would continue to perform and record with Harvey throughout her career. The album was also her first material to be produced by Flood. A blues-influenced and futuristic record, To Bring You My Love included strings, organs and synthesisers. Rolling Stone said in its review that "Harvey sings the blues like Nick Cave sings gospel: with more distortion, sex and murder than you remember. To Bring You My Love was a towering goth version of grunge."

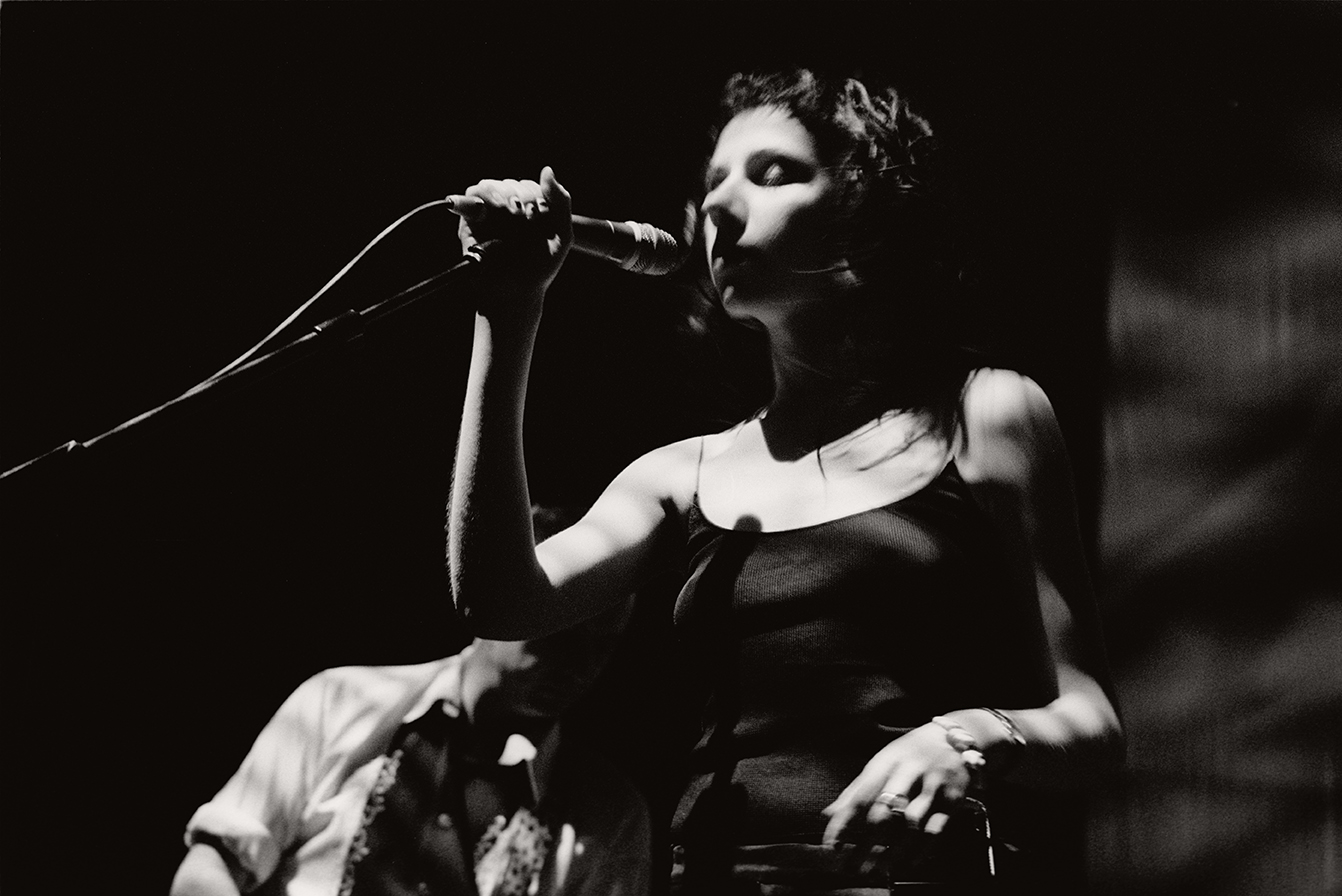
Harvey performing in Cologne, Germany, 1998

The record generated a surprise modern rock radio hit in the United States with its lead single, "Down by the Water". The music video received heavy rotation on MTV and became Harvey's most recognizable song. Three consecutive singles—"C'mon Billy", "Send His Love to Me" and "Long Snake Moan"—were also moderately successful. The album sold one million copies worldwide including 370,000 in the United States. It was also certified Silver in the United Kingdom within seven months of its release, having sold over 60,000 copies. In the US, the album was voted Album of the Year by The Village Voice, Rolling Stone, USA Today, People, The New York Times and the Los Angeles Times. Rolling Stone also named Harvey 1995's Artist of the Year and Spin ranked the album third in The 90 Greatest Albums of the 1990s, behind Nirvana's Nevermind (1991) and Public Enemy's Fear of a Black Planet (1990). In 1996, Harvey also received her first Grammy Award nominations for Best Alternative Music and Best Female Rock Vocal Performance ("Down by the Water").

In 1996, following the international success of To Bring You My Love and experimental collaboration album Dance Hall at Louse Point with John Parish, Harvey began composing material that would end up on her fourth studio album, during what she referred to as "an incredibly low patch". The material introduced electronica elements into her work. During recording sessions in 1997 original PJ Harvey Trio drummer Rob Ellis rejoined Harvey's band, and Flood was hired again as producer. The sessions, which continued into April the following year, resulted in Is This Desire? (1998). Originally released in September 1998, the album received a Grammy Award nomination for Best Alternative Music Performance. The album's lead single, "A Perfect Day Elise", was moderately successful in the United Kingdom, peaking at number 25 on the UK Singles Chart, her most successful single to date.

In July 2020, a vinyl reissue of To Bring You My Love was announced, including unreleased demos.

=== Stories from the City, Stories from the Sea and Uh Huh Her: 2000–2006 ===
"Good Fortune"
from Stories from the City, Stories from the Sea (2000). The song drew comparisons to Patti Smith and Chrissie Hynde.

In early 2000, Harvey began work on her fifth studio album Stories from the City, Stories from the Sea with Rob Ellis and Mick Harvey. Written in her native Dorset, Paris and New York, the album showcased a more mainstream indie rock and pop rock sound to her previous albums and the lyrics followed themes of love that tied into Harvey's affection for New York City. The album featured Radiohead frontman Thom Yorke on three tracks, including his lead vocals on "This Mess We're In". Upon its release in October 2000 the album was a critical and commercial success, selling over one million copies worldwide and charting in both the United Kingdom and the United States. The album's three singles—"Good Fortune", "A Place Called Home" and "This Is Love"—were moderately successful.

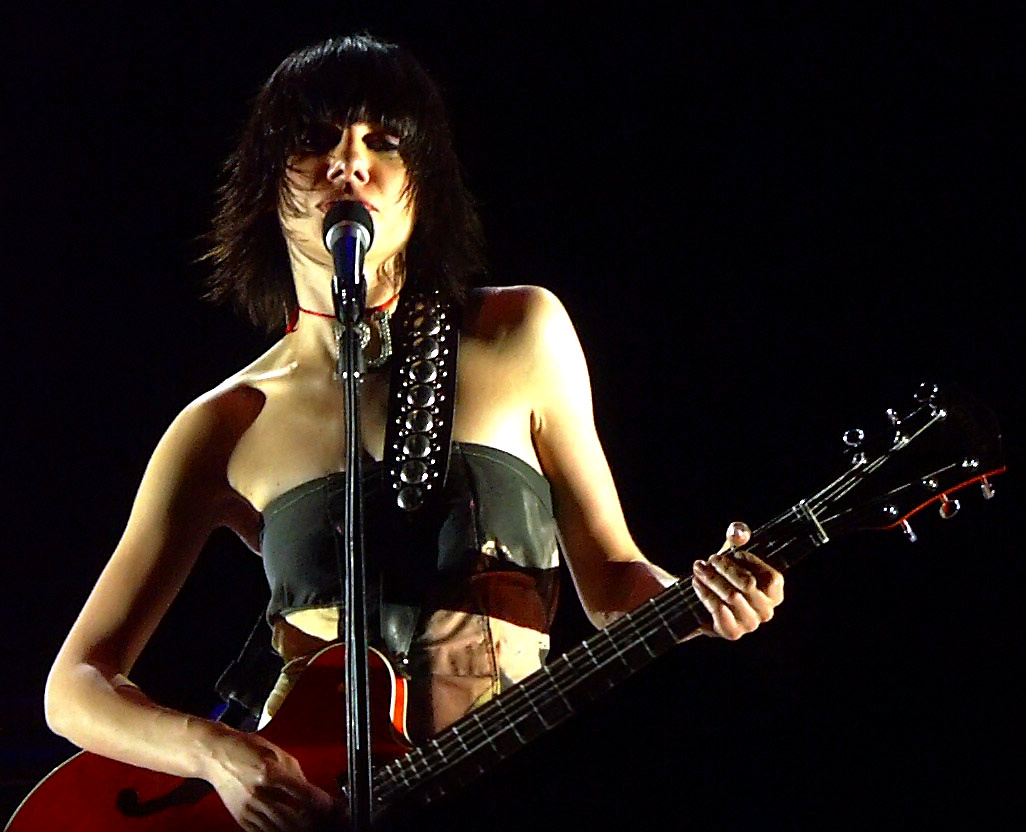
Harvey performing live in 2004

The album won a BRIT Award nomination for Best Female Artist and two Grammy Award nominations for Best Rock Album and Best Female Rock Performance for the album's third single, "This Is Love". Harvey was nominated for, and won, the 2001 Mercury Prize. The awards ceremony was held on the same day as the September 11 attacks on the United States and Harvey was on tour in Washington, D.C., one of the affected cities, when she won the prize. Reflecting on the win in 2001, she said: "quite naturally I look back at that and only remember the events that were taking place across the world and to win the prize on that day—it didn't have much importance in the grand scheme of things", noting "it was a very surreal day". The same year, Harvey also topped a readers' poll conducted by Q magazine of the 100 Greatest Women in Rock Music.

During three years of various collaborations with other artists, Harvey was also working on her sixth studio album, Uh Huh Her, which was released in May 2004. For the first time since 4-Track Demos (1993), Harvey played every instrument—with the exception of drums provided by Rob Ellis—and was the sole producer. The album received "generally favourable reviews" by critics, but its production was criticised. It debuted and peaked at number 12 in the UK Albums Chart and was certified Silver by the BPI within a month of its release.

Harvey also did an extensive world tour in promotion of the album, lasting seven months. Selected recordings from the tour were included on Harvey's first live DVD, On Tour: Please Leave Quietly, directed by Maria Mochnacz and released in 2006.

=== White Chalk and Let England Shake: 2007–2014 ===
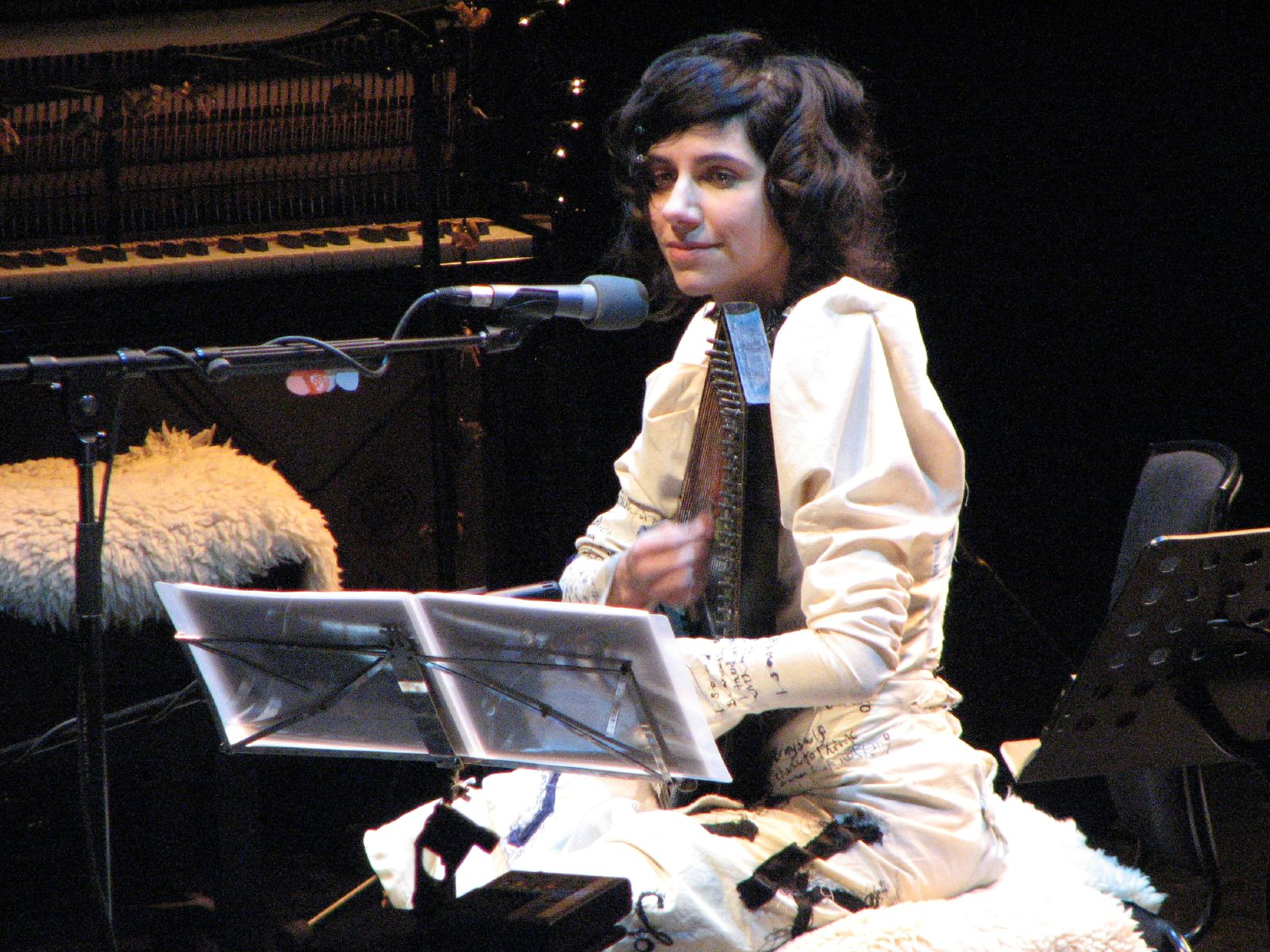
Harvey performing live during the White Chalk tour in 2007

During her first performance since the Uh Huh Her tour at the Hay Festival of Literature & Arts on 26 May 2006, Harvey revealed that her next studio album would be almost entirely piano-based. Following the October release of The Peel Sessions 1991–2004, a compilation of songs recorded from 1991 to 2000 during her radio sessions with John Peel, she began recording her seventh studio album White Chalk in November, together with Flood, John Parish and Eric Drew Feldman and drummer Jim White in a studio in West London. White Chalk was released in September 2007 and marked a radical departure from her usual alternative rock style, consisting mainly of piano ballads. The album received favourable reviews, its style being described by one critic as containing "pseudo-Victorian elements—drama, restraint, and antiquated instruments and sounds." Harvey herself said of the album: "when I listen to the record I feel in a different universe, really, and I'm not sure whether it's in the past or in the future. The record confuses me, that's what I like—it doesn't feel of this time right now, but I'm not sure whether it's 100 years ago or 100 years in the future", summing up the album's sound as "really weird." During the tour for the album Harvey performed without a backing band, and also began performing on an autoharp, which continues to be her primary instrument after guitar and has influenced her material since White Chalk.

March 2009 saw the release of her second collaboration studio album with John Parish A Woman a Man Walked By. Written in the vein of punk blues, folk and experimental rock, it was preceded by the lead single Black Hearted Love. As with their first effort, Parish wrote all of the music and played most of the instruments, leaving Harvey to the lyrics and singing.

In April 2010, Harvey appeared on The Andrew Marr Show to perform a new song titled "Let England Shake". In a pre-performance interview with Marr, she stated that the new material she had written had been "formed out of the landscape that I've grown up in and the history of this nation" and as "a human being affected by politics." Her eighth studio album Let England Shake was released in February 2011, and received universal critical acclaim. NME's 10/10 review summarised the album as "a record that ventures deep into the heart of darkness of war itself and its resonance throughout England's past, present and future" and other reviews also noted its themes and writing style as "bloody and forceful", mixing "ethereal form with brutal content", and "her most powerful." Dealing with the then-conflict in Afghanistan and other episodes from English history, the album featured John Parish, Mick Harvey and Jean-Marc Butty as Harvey's backing band and the quartet toured extensively in its promotion. Following the release of the album's two well-received singles—"The Words That Maketh Murder" and "The Glorious Land"—and the collection of short films by Seamus Murphy to accompany the album, Harvey won her second Mercury Music Prize on 6 September. The award marked her as the first artist to receive the award twice, entering her into the Guinness World Records as the only artist to have achieved this, and sales of Let England Shake increased 1,190% overnight following her win. On 23 September, Let England Shake was certified Gold in the United Kingdom and was listed as album of the year by MOJO and Uncut.

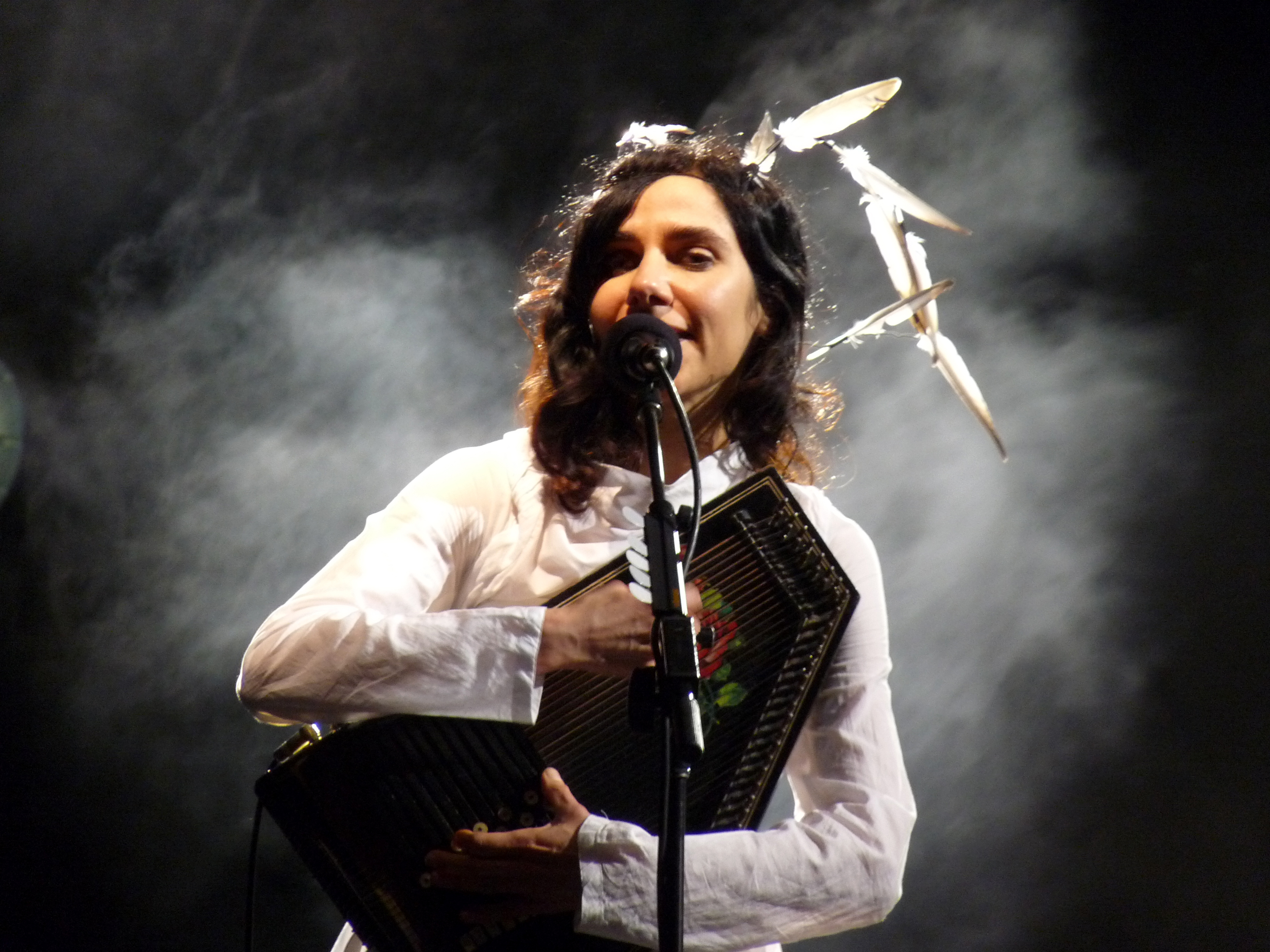
Harvey at Coachella 2011

On 3 August 2013, Harvey released a song "Shaker Aamer" in support of the Guantanamo Bay detention camp detainee by the same name who was the last British citizen to be held there. The song describes in detail what Aamer endured during his four-month hunger strike.

=== The Hope Six Demolition Project, and I Inside the Old Year Dying: 2015–present ===
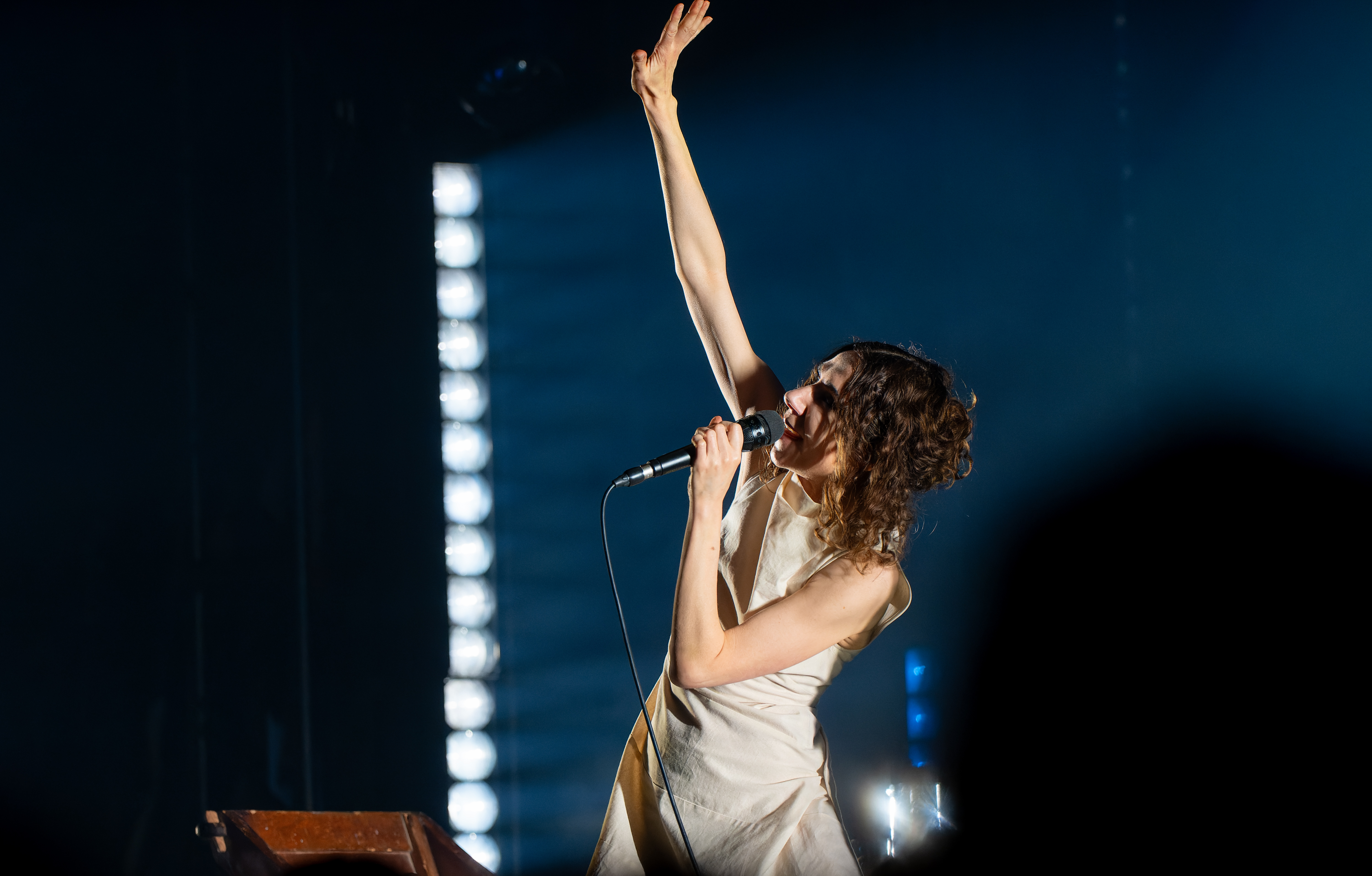
Harvey performing at the Roundhouse, 2023

On 16 January 2015, PJ Harvey began recording her ninth studio album, The Hope Six Demolition Project, in front of a live audience. A custom built recording studio was made in London's Somerset House. Uncut magazine noted that much like her previous album Let England Shake, many of the lyrics were politically charged, but this time it was more globally focused. While recording she was shown to be using saxophones, an autoharp and a bouzouki. Flood was confirmed to be the producer of the album. On 18 December 2015, Harvey released a 20-second teaser for the album, which contained a release date of spring 2016.

On 21 January 2016, the debut single, "The Wheel", was played on Steve Lamacq's show on BBC Radio 6 Music. The album was released on 15 April. A new video, "The Orange Monkey", was shared on 2 June 2016. Directed by Irish filmmaker Seamus Murphy, it was made from footage of Murphy's and Harvey's trips to Afghanistan. Together they have also traveled to Washington, D.C., and Kosovo and their collaboration yielded the 2015 book The Hollow of the Hand, which collected her poems and his photographs. Their impressions from the journey and the creative process behind the recording of the new album were chronicled in the documentary called A Dog Called Money, which was premiered at the 69th Berlin International Film Festival.

The album reached number one on the UK Albums Chart and was nominated for a Grammy Award in the Best Alternative Music Album category. Harvey spent much of 2016 and 2017 touring the world with her nine-piece band, playing mainly on saxophone and taking her critically lauded live show around North America, South America, Europe and Australasia.

Harvey remained active since then, frequently releasing folk songs for soundtracks to popular TV series and films. In 2019, she released the instrumental soundtrack album to the Ivo van Hove stage adaptation of All About Eve with the vocals of Gillian Anderson and Lily James. In October 2022, she released another full soundtrack album to the Irish black comedy Apple TV+ TV Series Bad Sisters together with Tim Phillips.

From 2020 up to 2022, UMC/Island Records and Beggars Group launched the reissue campaign of her studio work, accompanied by separate demo records to each album. In the culmination of the reissue project, the compilation of 59 songs, previously unavailable physically or digitally, titled B-Sides, Demos and Rarities was released on 4 November 2022.

In June 2022, Harvey stated that her next studio album is scheduled to be released in summer 2023. In January 2023, Rolling Stone ranked Harvey at number 145 on its list of the 200 Greatest Singers of All Time.

In April 2023, it was announced on Harvey's official website that her tenth studio album I Inside the Old Year Dying would be released on 7 July 2023 on Partisan Records. It also marked the first time (since the release of Dry on Too Pure in 1992), Harvey releasing her album on the independent label, after 30 years being signed on Island Records, part of Universal Music Group. The first single "A Child's Question, August" premiered on 26 April 2023. Harvey toured worldwide to support the new album from September 2023 to March 2025. The album has been met with widespread critical acclaim, debuted at number 5 at UK Albums Chart and has been nominated as the Best Alternative Music Album at the 66th Annual Grammy Awards.

In the end of December 2025, Harvey confirmed via social media, that she is writing songs for her 11th studio album and poems for her next book. She also shared a playlist of songs with deep roots in folk, jazz, post-punk, ambient and art music.

On 24 June 2026, PJ Harvey released a new song 'Voyager' with Partisan Records, inspired by the NASA missions. The song was developed after Professor Brian Cox invited Harvey to contribute a song for his Emergence world tour. The song was recorded at Miraval Studios in Provence, France.

== Collaborations and projects ==
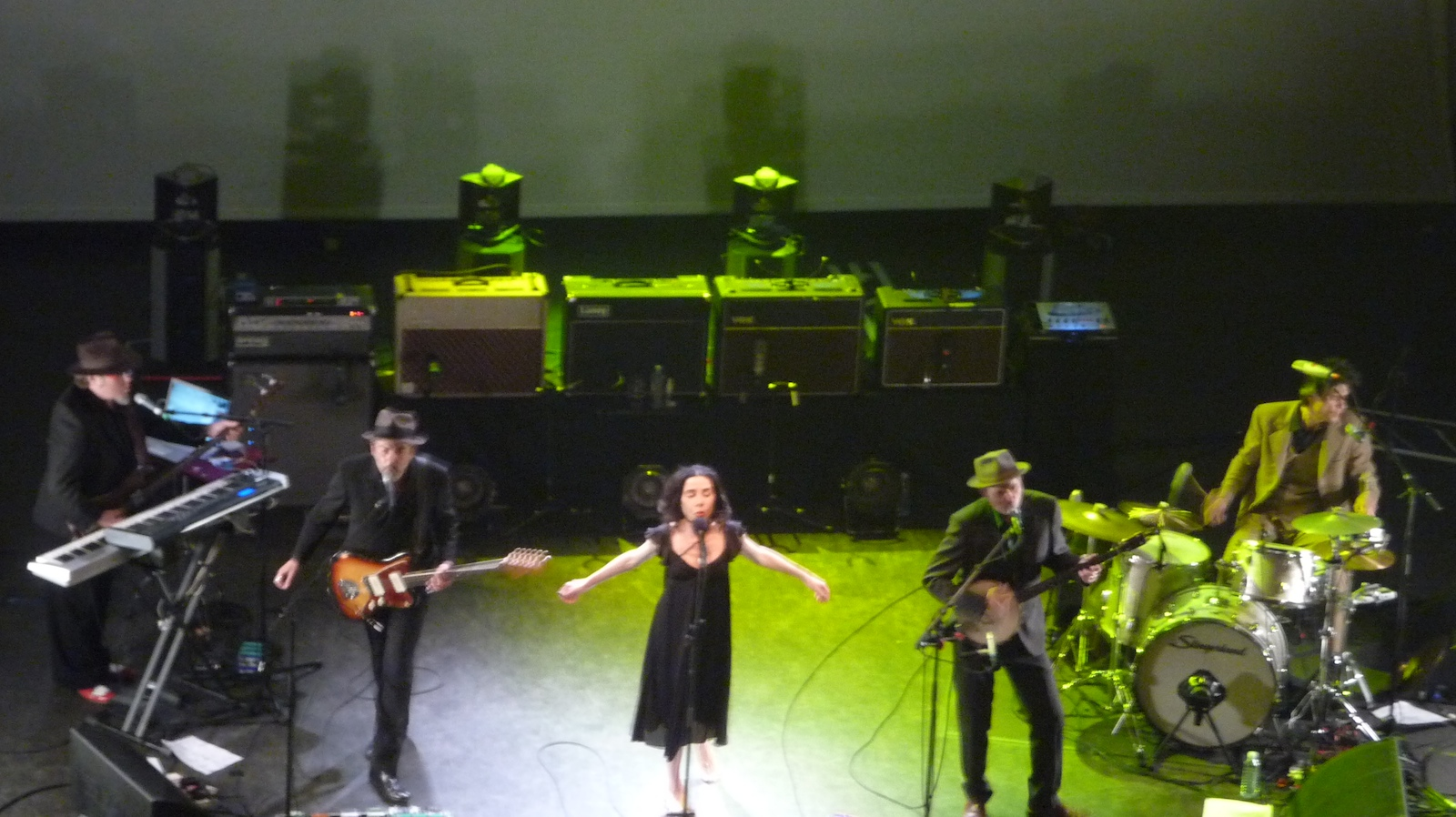
John Parish and Harvey performing live in 2009. Parish—whom Harvey describes as her "musical soulmate"—has been working with Harvey for over 20 years

Besides her own work, Harvey has also collaborated with a number of other artists. In 1995, she recorded a duet of American folk song "Henry Lee" with her then-partner Nick Cave and also featured on the Bob Dylan cover "Death is Not the End", both released on Nick Cave and the Bad Seeds' Murder Ballads (1996). In the same year she sang the theme song "Who Will Love Me Now?" on Philip Ridley's film The Passion of Darkly Noon. After her 1995 tour, she met Pascal Comelade and decided to collaborate with him, singing on several tracks including "Love Too Soon" on his album L'Argot du Bruit. In May 1998, before the release of Is This Desire?, she featured on Tricky's Angels with Dirty Faces, performing lead vocals on "Broken Homes", and also contributed to Sparklehorse's 2001 album It's a Wonderful Life performing guitar, piano and backing vocals on two songs, "Eyepennies" and "Piano Fire". Following the tour in promotion of Stories from the City, Stories from the Sea, she contributed vocals to eight tracks on Volume 9: I See You Hearin' Me and Volume 10: I Heart Disco by Josh Homme's side project the Desert Sessions, also appearing in the music video for "Crawl Home". Throughout 2004, Harvey produced Tiffany Anders' album Funny Cry Happy Gift, and also produced, performed on and wrote five songs for Marianne Faithfull's album Before the Poison, and contributed backing vocals on "Hit the City", "Methamphetamine Blues" and "Come to Me" on Mark Lanegan's album Bubblegum. Harvey contributed the song "Slow-Motion Movie-Star", an outtake from Stories from the City, Stories from the Sea, to Mick Harvey's fourth studio album, Two of Diamonds, released in 2007.

Harvey has also recorded two studio albums with long-time collaborator John Parish. Dance Hall at Louse Point (1996) was written collectively with Parish with the exception of the song "Is That All There Is?", written by Jerry Leiber and Mike Stoller. The album also listed her as Polly Jean Harvey, which may have impacted album sales. Harvey has also reflected on how the album was "an enormous turning point" and "lyrically, it moved me into areas I'd never been to before." In 1998, she also performed lead vocals on "Airplane Blues", as a soundtrack accompaniment to the Wingwalkers art exhibition by Rebecca Goddard and Parish's wife, Michelle Henning, which was released as the closing song on Parish's second solo album How Animals Move in 2002. Following the release of White Chalk, Harvey reunited with Parish to record A Woman a Man Walked By, released in March 2009. Like Dance Hall at Louse Point, the album received positive reviews and was a moderate commercial success, peaking at number 25 in the UK Albums Chart. She collaborated with Egyptian musician Ramy Essam on "The Camp", a charity single released in June 2017 to benefit displaced children in the Lebanese Bekaa Valley fleeing the Syrian civil war.

Aside from collaborations, Harvey has also embarked on a number of projects as a composer. In January 2009, a new stage production of Henrik Ibsen's Hedda Gabler opened on Broadway. Directed by Ian Rickson and starring Mary-Louise Parker in the title role, the play featured an original score of incidental music written by Harvey. In November 2011, Harvey also composed part of the score for Young Vic's long-running production of Hamlet in London. She subsequently worked with Rickson a number of times, contributing music for his stage production of Electra, The Nest, and The Goat. In 2019, Harvey scored Ivo van Hove's West End production of All About Eve. She documented her artistic process for writing scores in an episode of the BBC Radio 4 programme 'Behind the Scenes' hosted by journalist John Wilson.

In May 2012, Harvey composed two songs, "Horse" and "Bobby Don't Steal", for Mark Cousins' film What is This Film Called Love?, which also features "To Bring You My Love".

In 2014, a number of Harvey's songs were featured in the second season of Peaky Blinders.

In March 2018, Harvey and Parish released a song called "Sorry For Your Loss" as tribute to singer-songwriter Mark Linkous, who took his own life in 2010.

In 2019, Harvey composed the score for Shane Meadows' miniseries, The Virtues, broadcast on Channel 4.

In 2022, Harvey composed the score for Sharon Horgan, Dave Finkel, and Brett Baer's Apple TV+ series Bad Sisters.

In 2024, Harvey's songs again feature on the stage in London Tide, directed by Ian Rickson, and based on Charles Dickens' Our Mutual Friend. London Tide is adapted by Ben Power and features original songs written by PJ Harvey and Ben Power.

In October 2025, a new stage adaptation of Othello opens at London's Theatre Royal Haymarket, directed by Tom Morris, starring David Harewood, Caitlin FitzGerald and Toby Jones, with music by PJ Harvey.

In June 2026, Harvey released the standalone single "Voyager" as a commission for the "Emergence World Tour" of English physicist and musician Brian Cox.

== Musical style and influences ==
Harvey possesses an expansive contralto vocal range. Harvey aims to not repeat herself in her music, which results in every album sounding different to her previous works. In an October 2004 interview with Rolling Stone, she said: "when I'm working on a new record, the most important thing is to not repeat myself ... that's always my aim: to try and cover new ground and really to challenge myself. Because I'm in this for learning." While her musical style has been described as alternative rock, punk blues, art rock, avant-rock, and grunge, she has experimented with various other genres including electronica, indie rock and folk music.

She changes her physical appearance for each album by altering her mode of dress or hairstyle, creating a unique aesthetic that extends to all aspects of the album, from the album art to the live performances. She works closely with friend and photographer Maria Mochnacz to develop the visual style of each album. Around the time of To Bring You My Love, for example, Harvey began experimenting with her image and adopting a theatrical aspect to her live performances. Her former fashion style, which consisted of simple black leggings, turtleneck sweaters and Dr. Martens boots, was replaced by ballgowns, catsuits, wigs and excessive make-up. She also began using stage props like a Ziggy Stardust-style flashlight microphone. She denied the influence of drag, Kabuki or performance art on her new image, a look she affectionately dubbed "Joan Crawford on acid" in an interview with Spin in 1996, but admitted that "it's that combination of being quite elegant and funny and revolting, all at the same time, that appeals to me. I actually find wearing make-up like that, sort of smeared around, as extremely beautiful. Maybe that's just my twisted sense of beauty." However, she later told Dazed & Confused magazine, "that was kind of a mask. It was much more of a mask than I've ever had. I was very lost as a person, at that point. I had no sense of self left at all", and has never repeated the overt theatricality of the To Bring You My Love tour.

At an early age, she was introduced by her parents to blues music, jazz and art rock, which would later influence her: "I was brought up listening to John Lee Hooker, to Howlin' Wolf, to Robert Johnson, and a lot of Jimi Hendrix and Captain Beefheart. So I was exposed to all these very compassionate musicians at a very young age, and that's always remained in me and seems to surface more as I get older. I think the way we are as we get older is a result of what we knew when we were children." Other influential artists were "Nina Simone, the Rolling Stones, people like that I grew up listening to but find I returned to". During her teenage years, she began listening to new wave and synth-pop bands such as Soft Cell, Duran Duran and Spandau Ballet, although later stated that it was a phase when she was "having a bit of a rebellion against my parents' record collection." In her later teenage years, she became a fan of Pixies, and she then listened to Slint. She has named Bob Dylan, and Neil Young, when talking about her influences. Many critics have compared Harvey to Patti Smith, which Harvey dismisses as "lazy journalism". However, recently Harvey has said that Smith is "so energising to see and so passionate with what she's doing". Harvey has also cited Siouxsie Sioux in terms of live performance, stating : "She is so exciting to watch, so full of energy and human raw quality". She has also drawn inspiration from Russian folk music, Italian soundtrack composer Ennio Morricone, classical composers like Arvo Pärt, Erik Satie, Samuel Barber, and Henryk Górecki. As a lyricist, Harvey has cited numerous poets, authors and lyricists as influences on her work including Harold Pinter, T. S. Eliot, W. B. Yeats, James Joyce, Ted Hughes and contemporaries such as Shane MacGowan and Jez Butterworth. Elvis Presley was also mentioned in her 2022 book Orlam and the 2023 single A Child's Question, August.

Harvey rejects the notion that her song lyrics are autobiographical, telling The Times in 1998: "the tortured artist myth is rampant. People paint me as some kind of black witchcraft-practising devil from hell, that I have to be twisted and dark to do what I am doing. It's a load of rubbish". She later told Spin: "some critics have taken my writing so literally to the point that they'll listen to 'Down by the Water' and believe I have actually given birth to a child and drowned her."

== Other ventures ==
Outside her better-known music career, Harvey is also an occasional artist and actress. In 1998, she appeared in Hal Hartley's film The Book of Life as Magdalena—a modern-day character based on the Biblical Mary Magdalene—and had a cameo role as a Playboy Bunny in A Bunny Girl's Tale, a short film directed by Sarah Miles, in which she also performs "Nina in Ecstasy", an outtake from Is This Desire? (1998). Harvey also collaborated with Miles on another film, Amaeru Fallout 1972, which includes Harvey performing a cover of "When Will I See You Again".

Harvey is also an accomplished sculptor who has had several pieces exhibited at the Lamont Gallery and the Bridport Arts Centre. In 2010, she was invited to be the guest designer for the summer issue of Francis Ford Coppola's literary magazine Zoetrope: All-Story. The issue featured Harvey's paintings and drawings alongside short stories by Woody Allen. Her most recent artwork features in her second book of poetry Orlam.

In December 2013, Harvey gave her debut public poetry reading at the British Library. On 2 January 2014, she guest-edited BBC Radio 4's the Today programme.

In October 2015, Harvey published her first collection of poetry, a collaboration with photographer Seamus Murphy, entitled The Hollow of The Hand. To create the book, Harvey and Murphy made several journeys to Kosovo, Afghanistan and Washington, D.C. Their experiences were documented in Murphy's film A Dog Called Money, which was released in UK cinemas on 8 November 2019. The pair had previously worked together to create 12 short films for Let England Shake.

In April 2022, she published a book-length narrative poem titled Orlam.

On 1 June 2024 Harvey kicked off her European tour to be followed by a tour of North America.

== Personal life ==
Harvey tends to keep her personal life private.In the early 1990s, Harvey was romantically involved with drummer and photographer Joe Dilworth of Stereolab. They split in 1992. In 1996, following their musical collaborations, Harvey had a four-month relationship with Nick Cave, and their subsequent break-up influenced Cave's follow-up studio album The Boatman's Call (1997), with songs such as "Into My Arms", "Far From Me", "West Country Girl" and "Black Hair" being written about her. In 1995, she stated that she would love to have children with "someone that I wanted to spend the rest of my life with."

Harvey was appointed Member of the Order of the British Empire (MBE) by Queen Elizabeth II in the 2013 Birthday Honours for services to music. As of 2023, she lives in Dorset.

== Personnel ==
=== Current members ===
- Polly Harvey – vocals, saxophone, guitar, autoharp, piano, organ, keyboards, violin, cello, vibraphone, marimba, bells and chimes, percussion, djembe, bass, melodica, zither, harmonica, harp, cigfiddle (since 1991)
- John Parish – guitar, drums, keyboards, bass, backing vocals, banjo, organ, ukulele, trombone, rhodes, mellotron, xylophone, percussion (1994–1998, since 2006)
- Jean-Marc Butty – drums, percussion, backing vocals (1994–1996, since 2006)
- James Johnston – keyboards, violin, guitar, organ, backing vocals (1993 live performance guest, since 2014)
- Giovanni Ferrario – guitar, bass, keyboards, backing vocals (2006–2009, since 2023)

=== Former collaborators ===
- Rob Ellis – drums and percussion, vocals, harmonium, piano, electric piano, tambourine, synthesizer, keyboards, bells, harpsichord, vibraphone (1991–1993, 1998–2004)
- Steve Vaughan – bass (1991–1993)
- Eric Drew Feldman – piano, keyboards, bass, optigan, mellotron, minimoog, backing vocals (1994–2009)
- Mick Harvey – bass, keyboards, organ, guitar, drums, backing vocals, harmonium, accordion, bass harmonica, piano, rhodes, xylophone, percussion (1994–2003, 2009–2017)
- Nick Bagnall – bass, keyboards (1994–1996)
- Joe Gore – guitar, e-bow (1994–1998)
- Jeremy Hogg – guitar (1996–1999)
- Margaret Fiedler – guitar, cello (2000–2001)
- Tim Farthing – guitar (2000–2001)
- Simon "Ding" Archer – bass (2004)
- Josh Klinghoffer – guitar, drums, percussion (2004)
- Jim White – drums (2006–2007)
- Carla Azar – drums (2006–2008, studio guest)
- Alain Johannes – guitars, keyboards, backing vocals, percussion, saxophone (2015–2017)
- Enrico Gabrielli – percussion, backing vocals, bass clarinet, swanee whistle, basset clarinet (2015–2017)
- Alessandro Stefana – guitars, backing vocals (2015–2017)
- Terry Edwards – saxophones, percussion, keyboards, guitar, backing vocals, flute, bass harmonica, melodica, trumpet (1993 live performance guest, 1997 studio guest, 2015–2017)
- Kenrick Rowe – percussion, backing vocals (2015–2017)

== Awards and nominations ==
- List of awards and nominations received by PJ Harvey

== Discography ==
- Dry (1992)
- Rid of Me (1993)
- To Bring You My Love (1995)
- Dance Hall at Louse Point (with John Parish)(1996)
- Is This Desire? (1998)
- Stories from the City, Stories from the Sea (2000)
- Uh Huh Her (2004)
- White Chalk (2007)
- A Woman a Man Walked By (with John Parish)(2009)
- Let England Shake (2011)
- The Hope Six Demolition Project (2016)
- I Inside the Old Year Dying (2023)
