= Maria Mochnacz =

British video director and photographer

- Citizenship: United Kingdom
- Occupations: Photographer; video music director
- Known for: collaboration with PJ Harvey
- Partner: John Parish
- Relatives: Annie Mochnacz (sister)
- Website: mariamochnacz.co.uk

Maria Mochnacz is a British photographer and music video director, best known for her collaborations with PJ Harvey.

== Life ==
Mochnacz holds a degree in fine arts. She also attended a photography course in Weston-super-Mare. Notably, she does not use digital cameras in her photography. She has been working with various musicians since 1991, as well as doing fashion and fine art work. She directed and designed most of PJ Harvey's music videos and album covers, including the most recognizable Rid of Me (1993). She also collaborated with other artists such as Marianne Faithfull, Robert Miles, M People, Julie Feeney, Richard Ashcroft, Robert Plant, and Nick Cave.

In the 1980s she was in a relationship with John Parish. She has a twin sister, Annie Mochnacz, who is a fashion designer.

== Cover arts ==
- PJ Harvey – Rid of Me (1993)
- PJ Harvey – 4-Track Demos (1993)
- Echobelly – Everyone's Got One (1994)
- Bark Psychosis – Independency (1994)
- PJ Harvey – To Bring You My Love (1995)
- John Parish & Polly Jean Harvey – Dance Hall at Louse Point (1996)
- The Raincoats – Looking in the Shadows (1996)
- Subcircus – Carousel (1996)
- PJ Harvey – Stories from the City, Stories from the Sea (2000)
- Giant Sand – Chore of Enchantment (2000)
- Howe Gelb – Confluence (2001)
- Echobelly – I Can't Imagine the World Without Me: The Best Of Echobelly (2001)
- John Parish – How Animals Move (2002)
- Robert Plant – Dreamland (2002)
- PJ Harvey – Uh Huh Her (2004)
- Smoke Fairies – Through Low Light and Trees (2010)
- Smoke Fairies – Blood Speaks (2012)
- White Hotel – First Water
- Chikinki – Sink and Stove

Source.

== Filmography ==
PJ Harvey

- PJ Harvey – Dress (1991)
- PJ Harvey – Sheela-Na-Gig (1992)
- PJ Harvey – 50ft Queenie (1993)
- PJ Harvey – Man-Size (1993)
- PJ Harvey – Reeling with PJ Harvey (1994)
- PJ Harvey – Down by the Water (1995)
- PJ Harvey – C'mon Billy (1995)
- PJ Harvey – Send His Love to Me (1995)
- PJ Harvey – That Was My Veil (1996)
- PJ Harvey – Is That All There Is (1996)
- PJ Harvey – A Perfect Day Elise (1998)
- PJ Harvey – The Wind (1999)
- PJ Harvey – Angelene (1999)
- PJ Harvey – The Letter (2004)
- PJ Harvey – Who the Fuck? (2004)
- PJ Harvey – You Come Through (2004)
- PJ Harvey – Shame (2004)
- PJ Harvey – On Tour: Please Leave Quietly (2006)
- PJ Harvey – When Under Ether (2007)
- PJ Harvey – The Piano (2007)
- PJ Harvey – The Devil (2008)

Others

- M People – Itchycoo Park (1995)
- Robert Miles – Fable (1996)
- Subcircus – U Love U (1997)
- Sven Väth – Fusion (1998)
- Patrick Wolf – Accident & Emergency (2007)

Source.
