= Rob Ellis (producer) =

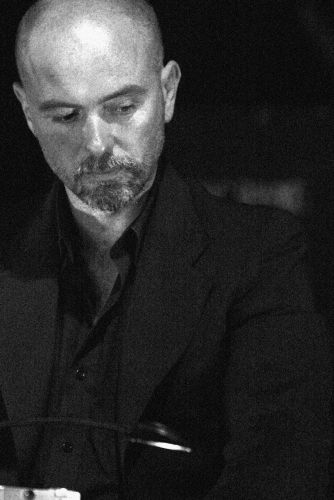
- Ellis performing in 2008

Background information
- Born: Robert Damian Ellis; 13 February 1962 (age 64); Bristol, England
- Genres: Alternative rock, contemporary classical
- Instruments: Drums, keyboards, vocals
- Years active: 1980–present
- Label: The Leaf Label
- Website: robellismusic.co.uk

Robert Damian Ellis (born 13 February 1962) is a producer, arranger, instrumentalist and composer. He is best known for his work with PJ Harvey, with whom he has been most closely associated as producer, arranger and musician since 1990. His own compositional work, which could be described as being something akin to contemporary classical music, has been released on six recordings, three under the name Spleen and three under his own name: Music for the home (2000) and Music for the home - Volume 2 (2004) for The Leaf Label, and The Nostalgia Machine for KPM.

He has also worked as producer/arranger and musician for such artists as Marianne Faithfull, Robyn Hitchcock, ex-Ash guitarist Charlotte Hatherley, Madrugada, Laika, Swell, Placebo, ex-Tricky singer Martina Topley-Bird, Scott Walker and Ute Lemper, Cold Specks and most recently Anna Calvi, Bat for Lashes, Torres, and the Blinders.

== Discography ==
=== Solo ===
- Music for the Home (2000)
- Music for the Home - Volume 2 (2004)
- The Nostalgia Machine (2020)

=== With PJ Harvey ===
- Dry (1992)
- Rid of Me (1993)
- Is This Desire? (1998)
- Stories from the City, Stories from the Sea (2000)
- Uh Huh Her (2004)
- The Peel Sessions 1991–2004 (2006)

=== With Spleen ===
- Soundtrack to Spleen (1996)
- Little Scratches (1998)
- Nun Lover! (2006)

=== With Automatic Dlamini ===
- D Is for Drum (1987)
- From Diva to Diver (1992)
