= PJ Harvey discography =

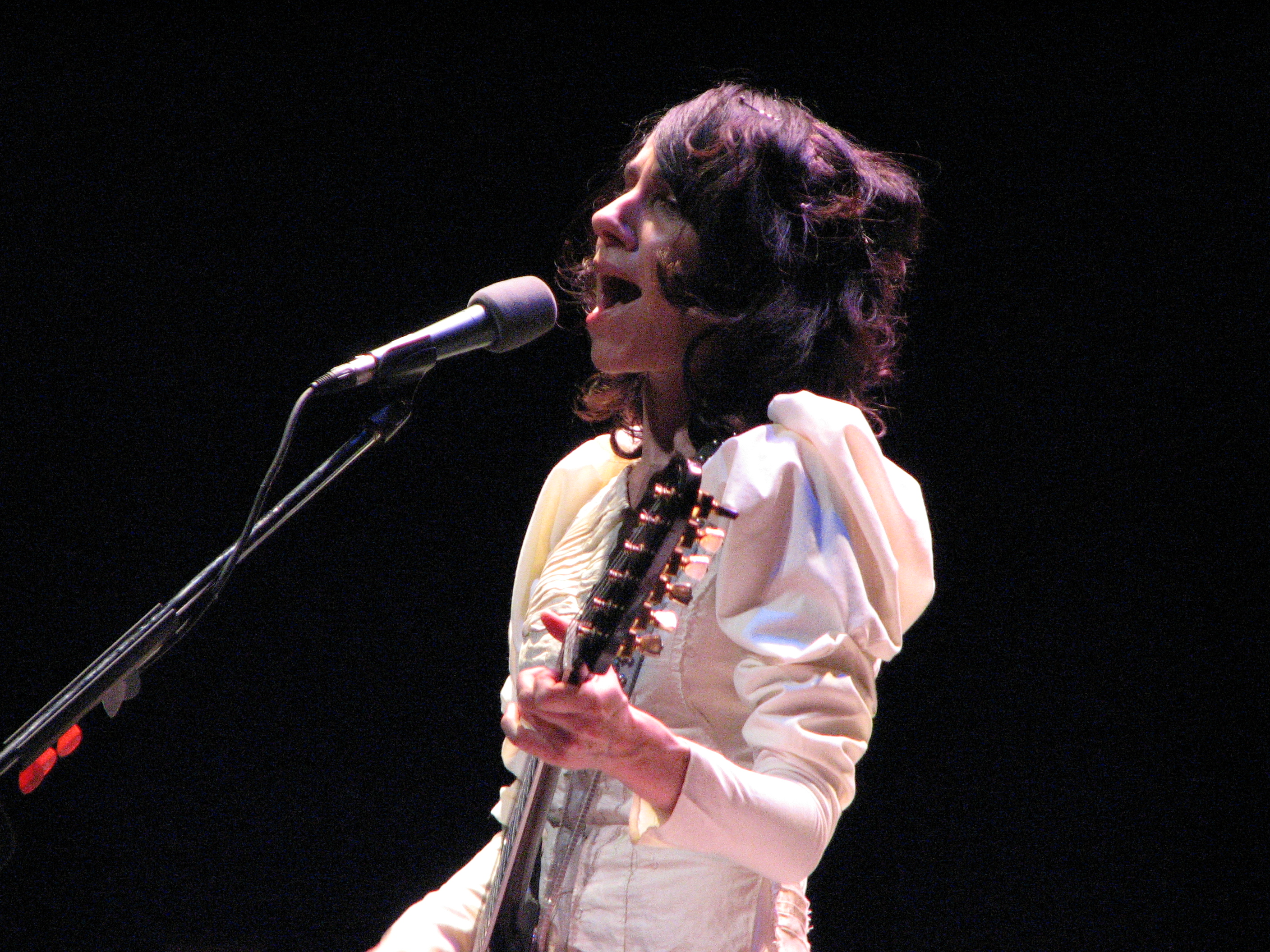
- PJ Harvey performing live in 2008.
- Studio albums: 10
- Extended plays: 1
- Soundtrack albums: 2
- Compilation albums: 3
- Singles: 23
- Video albums: 3
- Music videos: 29
- Collaborative albums: 2
- Miscellaneous: 17
- Other: 20

The discography of PJ Harvey, an English alternative rock musician, consists of ten studio albums, two collaboration albums with John Parish, twenty-two singles, one extended play, three compilation albums and a number of collaborations with other artists.

Following her departure from Automatic Dlamini in January 1991, Harvey formed the PJ Harvey Trio. The trio, which included Rob Ellis and Steve Vaughan, released Dry in 1992 on the independent label Too Pure and later released Rid of Me in 1993 on major label Island. The trio split in late 1993 and Harvey continued as a solo artist under the same name. In 1995, she released To Bring You My Love, often considered to be her mainstream breakthrough, and the album charted in twelve countries worldwide upon its release. Between To Bring You My Love and its follow-up, Is This Desire? (1998), Harvey released the collaborative album Dance Hall at Louse Point (1996) with John Parish. Her fifth album, Stories from the City, Stories from the Sea, was released in 2000, received the Mercury Music Prize in 2001 and was considered by critics to be her magnum opus. In 2004, her sixth album, Uh Huh Her, was released and became Harvey's highest-charting album in the United States, peaking at number 29 in the Billboard 200. In 2007, her seventh album, White Chalk, was released and in 2009, Parish and Harvey released their second collaborative album, A Woman a Man Walked By. In 2011, her eighth studio album, Let England Shake, was released and received the Mercury Music Prize, making Harvey the only artist in history to have won the award twice and increasing record sales by over 1,100% overnight.

In the United Kingdom, five of Harvey's albums have been certified Silver, one certified Gold and one certified Platinum, amounting to total sales of over 800,000 copies. In the United States, her albums have collectively sold over 1.5 million copies as of 2007, according to Nielsen SoundScan.

== Albums ==
=== Studio albums ===
Title	Album details	Peak chart positions														Sales	Certifications
Title	Album details	UK	AUS	AUT	BEL	CAN	SWI	GER	FRA	IRE	NLD	NZ	NOR	SWE	US	Sales	Certifications
Dry	Released: 30 March 1992; Label: Too Pure; Formats: CD, LP, 2×LP,^{[I]} CS	11	156	—	—	—	—	—	149	—	—	—	—	—	—	US: 176,000	BPI: Silver
Rid of Me	Released: 26 April 1993; Label: Island; Formats: CD, LP, CS	3	110	—	190	—	43	58	—	—	—	—	—	—	158	UK: 200,000; US: 207,000	BPI: Silver
To Bring You My Love	Released: 27 February 1995; Label: Island; Formats: CD, 2xCD,^{[II]} LP, CS	12	38	73	5	39	38	39	—	—	69	24	11	11	40	US: 371,000; WW: 1,000,000	BPI: Gold; BEA: Gold
Is This Desire?	Released: 28 September 1998; Label: Island; Formats: CD, LP, CS	17	30	—	8	59	—	23	9	—	74	—	5	19	54	US: 164,000; WW: 500,000	BPI: Silver; SNEP: Gold
Stories from the City, Stories from the Sea	Released: 23 October 2000; Label: Island; Formats: CD, LP, CS	23	20	43	35	37	26	54	7	17	42	42	8	10	42	US: 357,000; UK: 294,000; WW: 1,000,000	BPI: Platinum; ARIA: Platinum; BEA: Gold; SNEP: Gold
Uh Huh Her	Released: 31 May 2004; Label: Island; Formats: CD, LP, CS	12	14	33	16	—	17	36	10	10	23	—	6	14	29	US: 135,000+	BPI: Silver
White Chalk	Released: 24 September 2007; Label: Island; Formats: CD, LP, digital download	11	24	66	12	77	21	54	10	15	34	35	7	24	65	US: 62,000	BPI: Silver
Let England Shake	Released: 14 February 2011; Label: Island; Formats: CD, LP, digital download	8	6	15	4	23	4	20	6	7	14	12	2	6	32	UK: 173,000; US: 86,000	BPI: Gold
The Hope Six Demolition Project	Released: 15 April 2016; Label: Island; Formats: CD, LP, digital download	1	7	8	3	38	4	11	5	2	4	7	2	8	63		
I Inside the Old Year Dying	Released: 7 July 2023; Label: Partisan; Formats: CD, LP, digital download	5	44	6	3	—	—	7	8	20	5	13	—	—	—		
"—" denotes a recording that did not chart or was not released in that territory.

=== Soundtrack albums ===
Title	Album details
All About Eve	Released: 12 April 2019; Label: Invada, Lakeshore; Format: CD, LP, digital download
Bad Sisters (Original Series Soundtrack)	Released: 14 October 2022; Label: ABC Signature; Format: Digital download

=== Demo albums ===
Title	Album details	Peak chart positions			
Title	Album details	UK	BEL	FRA	SWI
4-Track Demos	Released: 19 October 1993; Label: Island; Formats: CD, LP, CS	19	—	—	—
Dry – Demos	Released: 24 July 2020; Label: Island; Formats: CD, LP, digital download	59	77	166	27
To Bring You My Love – Demos	Released: 11 September 2020; Label: Island; Formats: CD, LP, digital download	71	—	—	—
Is This Desire? – Demos	Released: 29 January 2021; Label: Island; Formats: CD, LP, digital download	—	65	—	—
Stories from the City Stories from the Sea – Demos	Released: 26 February 2021; Label: Island; Formats: CD, LP, digital download	71	65	—	25
Uh Huh Her – Demos	Released: 30 April 2021; Label: Island; Formats: CD, LP, digital download	—	116	—	40
White Chalk – Demos	Released: 25 June 2021; Label: Island; Formats: CD, LP, digital download	—	99	—	—
Let England Shake – Demos	Released: 28 January 2022; Label: Island; Formats: CD, LP, digital download	—	181	—	—
The Hope Six Demolition Project – Demos	Released: 11 March 2022; Label: Island; Formats: CD, LP, digital download	—	—	—	—
"—" denotes a recording that did not chart or was not released in that territory.

- I Limited edition versions of Dry included a second LP titled Demonstration, featuring acoustic demos.
- II Limited edition versions of To Bring You My Love included a bonus disc of b-sides.

=== Collaborative albums with John Parish ===
Title	Album details	Peak chart positions											
Title	Album details	UK	AUS	AUT	BEL	SWI	GER	FRA	IRE	NLD	NOR	SWE	US
Dance Hall at Louse Point	Released: 23 September 1996; Label: Island Records; Formats: CD, LP, CS	46	126	—	—	—	—	—	—	—	—	29	178
A Woman a Man Walked By	Released: 30 March 2009; Label: Island Records; Formats: CD, LP, digital download	25	25	55	11	24	62	13	39	46	13	—	80
"—" denotes a recording that did not chart or was not released in that territory.

=== Compilation albums ===
Title	Album details	Peak chart positions			
Title	Album details	UK	AUS	BEL	
iTunes Originals – PJ Harvey	Released: 25 October 2004; Label: Island; Formats: Digital download (20xAAC)	—	—	—	—
The Peel Sessions 1991–2004	Released: 23 October 2006; Label: Island, Universal; Formats: CD, LP	121	—	46	—
B-Sides, Demos & Rarities	Released: 4 November 2022; Label: UMe/Island, Beggars Group; Formats: CD, LP	96	—	79	—
"—" denotes a recording that did not chart or was not released in that territory.

== Extended plays ==
Title	EP details
B-Sides	Released: 12 October 2004; Label: Island; Format: CD
iTunes Session	Released: 12 September 2011; Label: Island; Format: Digital download (8xAAC)

== Singles ==
=== As lead artist ===
Title	Year	Peak chart positions						Album
Title	Year	UK	AUS	CAN	FRA	IRL	US Alt	Album
"Dress"	1991	—	—	—	—	—	—	Dry
"Sheela-Na-Gig"	1992	69	—	—	—	—	9	Dry
"50ft Queenie"	1993	27	179	—	—	—	—	Rid of Me
"Man-Size"	1993	42	—	—	—	—	—	Rid of Me
"Down by the Water"	1995	38	84	78	—	28	2	To Bring You My Love
"C'mon Billy"	1995	29	128	—	—	—	—	To Bring You My Love
"Send His Love to Me"	1995	34	125	—	—	—	—	To Bring You My Love
"That Was My Veil" (with John Parish)	1996	75	—	—	—	—	—	Dance Hall at Louse Point
"A Perfect Day Elise"	1998	25	83	—	70	—	33	Is This Desire?
"The Wind"	1998	29	—	—	—	—	—	Is This Desire?
"Good Fortune"	2000	41	71	—	100	—	—	Stories from the City, Stories from the Sea
"A Place Called Home"	2001	43	—	—	—	—	—	Stories from the City, Stories from the Sea
"This Is Love"	2001	41	—	—	—	—	—	Stories from the City, Stories from the Sea
"The Letter"	2004	28	—	—	73	46	—	Uh Huh Her
"You Come Through"	2004	41	—	—	—	—	—	Uh Huh Her
"Shame"	2004	45	—	—	—	—	—	Uh Huh Her
"When Under Ether"	2007	101	—	—	—	—	—	White Chalk
"The Piano"	2007	—	—	—	—	—	—	White Chalk
"The Devil"	2008	—	—	—	—	—	—	White Chalk
"Good Fortune" (2008 remix) (12" only)	2008	—	—	—	—	—	—	Non-album single
"Black Hearted Love" (with John Parish)	2009	—	—	—	—	—	—	A Woman a Man Walked By
"The Words That Maketh Murder"	2011	—	—	—	—	—	—	Let England Shake
"The Glorious Land"	2011	—	—	—	—	—	—	Let England Shake
"Written on the Forehead"	2012	—	—	—	—	—	—	Let England Shake
"The Wheel"	2016	—	—	—	—	—	—	The Hope Six Demolition Project
"The Community of Hope"	2016	—	—	—	—	—	—	The Hope Six Demolition Project
"The Orange Monkey"	2016	—	—	—	—	—	—	The Hope Six Demolition Project
"Guilty"	2016	—	—	—	—	—	—	Non-album singles
"The Camp" (with Ramy Essam)	2017	—	—	—	—	—	—	Non-album singles
"A Dog Called Money / I'll Be Waiting"	2017	—	—	—	—	—	—	Non-album singles
"An Acre of Land" (with Harry Escott)	2018	—	—	—	—	—	—	Non-album singles
"The Crowded Cell"	2019	—	—	—	—	—	—	The Virtues soundtrack
"Red Right Hand"	2019	—	—	—	—	—	—	Peaky Blinders soundtrack
"A Child's Question, August"	2023	—	—	—	—	—	—	I Inside the Old Year Dying
"I Inside the Old I Dying"	2023	—	—	—	—	—	—	I Inside the Old Year Dying
"Voyager"	2026	—	—	—	—	—	—	TBC

=== As featured artist ===
Title	Year	Peak chart positions					Album
Title	Year	UK	AUS	FIN	FRA	SWE	Album
"Henry Lee" (with Nick Cave and the Bad Seeds)	1996	36	73	15	—	33	Murder Ballads
"Broken Homes" (with Tricky)	1998	25	89	—	56	—	Angels with Dirty Faces
"Crawl Home" (with The Desert Sessions)	2003	41	—	—	—	—	Volumes 9 & 10

== Other appearances ==
=== Soundtracks ===
Year	Song(s)	Album	Notes	Ref.
1996	"Naked Cousin"	The Crow: City of Angels OST	Recorded especially for the soundtrack.	
1996	"Daddy" "Rest Sextet"	Spleen OST	Recorded especially for the soundtrack.	
1996	"Is That All There Is?"	Basquiat OST	Also featured on Dance Hall at Louse Point.	
1996	"This is Mine"	Stella Does Tricks Soundtrack	Written and recorded especially for the film.	
1999	"The Faster I Breathe the Further I Go"	The Book of Life OST	Also released as a B-side to "The Wind".	
1999	"Nickel Under the Foot"	Cradle Will Rock OST	Marc Blitzstein cover recorded especially for the soundtrack.	
2012	"Horses" "Bobby Don't Steal"	What Is This Film Called Love? Soundtrack	Written exclusively for the film.	
2013	"Who Will Love Me Now?"	The Passion of Darkly Noon Soundtrack	Written by Nick Bicât and Philip Ridley for the 1995 film.	
2018	"An Acre of Land"	Dark River	Recorded with the film's composer Harry Escott.	
2019	"Prayer" "Submerge" "Death" "The Lonely Wolf" "Subterranean" "The Crowded Cell"	The Virtues	original score	
2019	"Red Right Hand"	Peaky Blinders	Nick Cave & the Bad Seeds cover	

=== Tributes ===
Year	Song(s)	Album	Notes	Ref.
1997	"Ballad of the Soldier's Wife"	September Songs – The Music of Kurt Weill Soundtrack	Kurt Weill cover recorded especially for the soundtrack.	
1997	"Zaz Turned Blue"	Lounge-A-Palooza	Mel Tormé cover recorded with Eric Drew Feldman	

=== Compilations ===
Year	Song(s)	Album	Notes	Ref.
1992	"Oh My Lover" "Sheela-Na-Gig" "Victory" "Water"	Too Pure – The Peel Sessions	From the trio's John Peel Session, later released on The Peel Sessions 1991-2004.	

=== Other project ===
Year	Song(s)	Notes	Ref.
2013	"Shaker Aamer"	Released to highlight the detention of the then last British resident held without trial inside the US prison at Guantánamo Bay. The track was streamed exclusively on The Guardian’s website	

=== Collaborations ===
Year	Song(s)	Artist	Album	Instrument(s)	Ref.
1990	—N/a	Automatic Dlamini	Here Catch, Shouted His Father	Vocals, saxophone	
1991	"Baby in a Plastic Bag"	Grape	Maths & Passion EP	Backing vocals	
1991	"Colour Me Grey" "River of Diamonds"	The Family Cat	Furthest from the Sun	Backing vocals	
1992	"Yell Hollow" "Putty" "So You Got a Horse" "Raw" "What's Fair" "Water"^{[I]}	Automatic Dlamini	From a Diva to a Diver	Vocals, guitar, bass, percussion	
1994	"Your Last Friend in This Town" "Just a Working Girl" "We're Making War" "Right to Fly" "Into Deep Neutral"	Moonshake	The Sound Your Eyes Can Follow	Backing vocals	
1996	"Death is Not the End"	Nick Cave and the Bad Seeds	Murder Ballads	Vocals	
1998	"Love Too Soon" "Green Eyes"	Pascal Comelade	L'Argot du Bruit	Vocals, composer	
1999	"Featherhead"	Pascal Comelade	Swing Slang Song	Vocals	
2001	—N/a	Tiffany Anders	Funny Cry Happy Gift	Vocals, guitar, backing vocals, producer	
2001	"Piano Fire" "Eyepennies"	Sparklehorse	It's a Wonderful Life	Guitar, piano, backing vocals	
2002	"Johnny Hit and Run Pauline"	Giant Sand	Cover Magazine	Vocals	
2002	"Airplane Blues"	John Parish	How Animals Move	Vocals	
2002	"Hitting the Ground"	Gordon Gano	Hitting the Ground	Vocals, guitar	
2003	"I Wanna Make It With Chu" "There Will Never Be a Better Time" "Crawl Home" "Powdered Wig Machine" "A Girl Like Me" "Dead in Love" "Holey Dime" "Bring it Back Gentle"	The Desert Sessions	Volumes 9 & 10	Vocals, guitar, bass, piano, saxophone, melodica	
2004	"The Mystery of Love" "My Friends Have" "No Child of Mine"^{[II]} "Before the Poison" "In the Factory"	Marianne Faithfull	Before the Poison	Guitar, backing vocals, composer, producer	
2004	"Hit the City" "Come to Me"	Mark Lanegan	Bubblegum	Vocals, backing vocals	
2011	"Lonely Avenue"	Ben Waters	Boogie 4 Stu	Vocals, saxophone	
N/A denotes performance on all songs.

- I Not the same song as "Water" featured on Dry.
- II Not the same song as "No Child of Mine" featured on Uh Huh Her, although the song incorporates elements of the PJ Harvey version.

== Videography ==
=== Music videos ===
Year	Title	Director(s)	Ref.
1991	"Dress"^{[I]}	Maria Mochnacz	
1992	"Sheela-Na-Gig"	Maria Mochnacz, Tim Farthling	
1993	"50ft Queenie"	Maria Mochnacz	
1993	"Man-Size"	Maria Mochnacz	
1995	"Down by the Water"	Maria Mochnacz	
1995	"C'mon Billy"	Maria Mochnacz	
1995	"Send His Love to Me"	Maria Mochnacz	
1996	"Henry Lee" (Nick Cave and the Bad Seeds)	Rocky Schenck	
1996	"That Was My Veil"	Maria Mochnacz	
1996	"Is That All There Is?"	Maria Mochnacz	
1997	"Ballad of the Soldier's Wife"	Larry Weinstein	
1998	"Broken Homes" (Tricky)	Theodore Witcher	
1998	"A Perfect Day Elise"	Maria Mochnacz	
1998	"The Wind"	Maria Mochnacz	
1998	"Angelene" ^{[II]}	Maria Mochnacz	
2000	"Good Fortune"	Sophie Muller	
2000	"A Place Called Home"	Sophie Muller	
2001	"This is Love"	Sophie Muller	
2003	"Crawl Home" (The Desert Sessions)	Hal Hartley	
2004	"Who the Fuck?"	Maria Mochnacz	
2004	"The Letter"	Maria Mochnacz	
2004	"You Come Through"	Maria Mochnacz	
2004	"Shame"	Maria Mochnacz	
2007	"When Under Ether"	Maria Mochnacz	
2007	"The Piano"	Maria Mochnacz	
2009	"Black Hearted Love"	Jake and Dinos Chapman	
2011	"Let England Shake"	Seamus Murphy	
2011	"The Last Living Rose"	Seamus Murphy	
2011	"The Glorious Land"	Seamus Murphy	
2011	"The Words That Maketh Murder"	Seamus Murphy	
2011	"All and Everyone"	Seamus Murphy	
2011	"On Battleship Hill"	Seamus Murphy	
2011	"England"	Seamus Murphy	
2011	"In The Dark Places"	Seamus Murphy	
2011	"Bitter Branches"	Seamus Murphy	
2011	"Hanging in the Wire"	Seamus Murphy	
2011	"Written on the Forehead"	Seamus Murphy	
2011	"The Colour of The Earth"	Seamus Murphy	
2016	"The Wheel"	Seamus Murphy	
2016	"The Community of Hope"	Seamus Murphy	
2016	"The Orange Monkey"	Seamus Murphy	
2023	"A Child's Question, August"		
2023	"I Inside the Old I Dying"		

I Two versions of the video for "Dress" were shot.

II The previously unseen video for "Angelene" was officially released in 2020.

=== Video albums ===
Year	Title
1994	Reeling with PJ Harvey: Released: 11 April 1994; Label: PolyGram; Format: VHS
2006	On Tour: Please Leave Quietly: Released: 1 May 2006; Label: Universal Island; Format: DVD
2011	Let England Shake: 12 Short Films by Seamus Murphy: Released: 12 December 2011; Label: Vagrant; Format: DVD, digital download (12xM4V)
