= List of awards and nominations received by PJ Harvey =

PJ Harvey awards and nominations
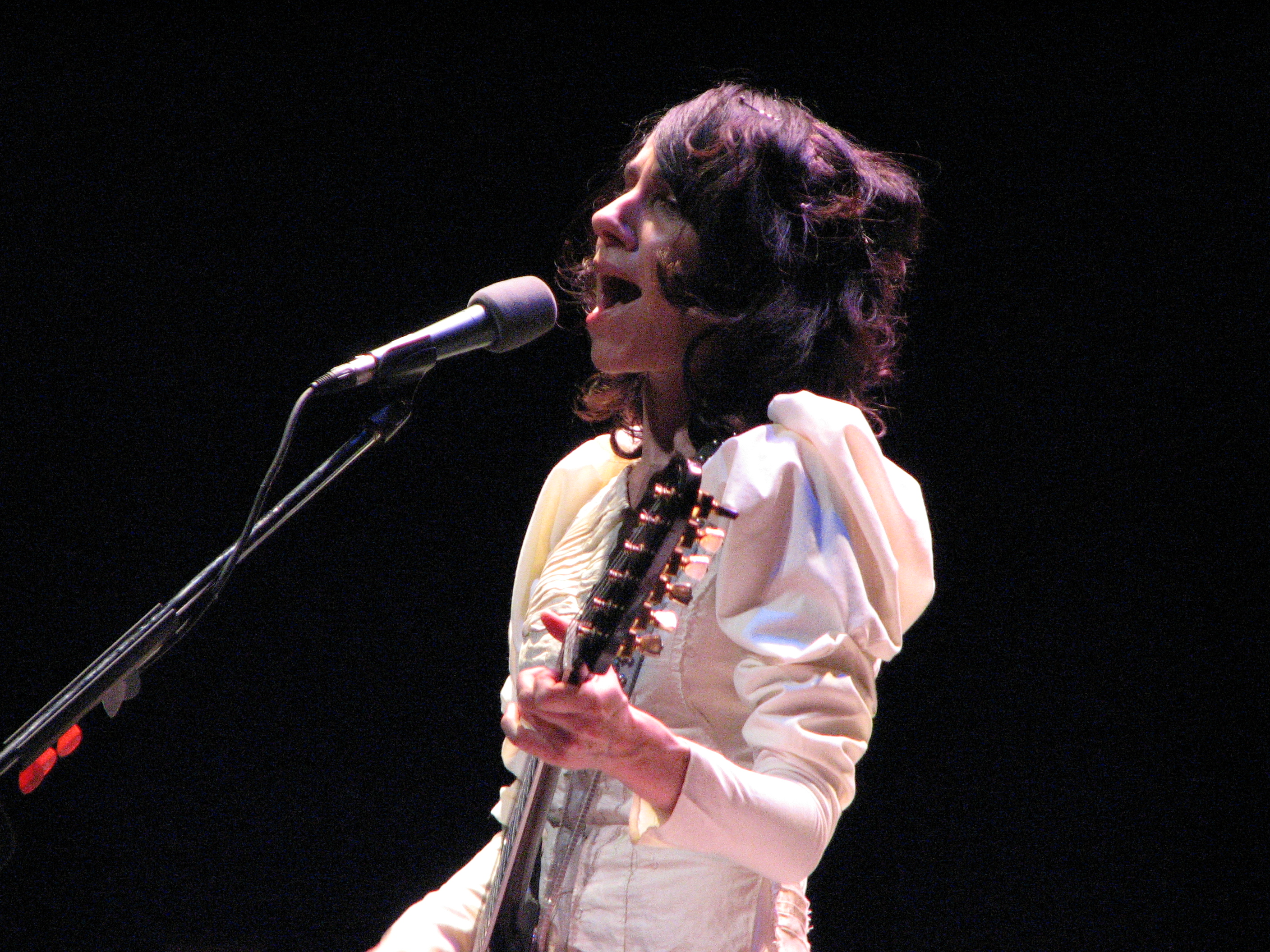
- PJ Harvey performing live in 2008
Awards and nominations
Award	Won	Nominated
BRIT Awards	0	8
Grammy Awards	0	7
Ivor Novello Awards	1	1
Mercury Prize	2	4
Meteor Music Awards	1	1
NME Awards	0	3
Q Awards	0	3
South Bank Sky Arts Awards	1	2
- Total number of wins and nominations
Totals	18	70
- References

PJ Harvey is an English musician and singer-songwriter. She has released ten studio albums—Dry (1992), Rid of Me (1993), To Bring You My Love (1995), Is This Desire? (1998), Stories from the City, Stories from the Sea (2000), Uh Huh Her (2004), White Chalk (2007), Let England Shake (2011), The Hope Six Demolition Project (2016), and I Inside the Old Year Dying (2023) —and two collaboration albums with John Parish. In addition, she has released three compilation albums and three video albums. Several of Harvey's singles have appeared on the UK Singles Chart, including "Down by the Water" which peaked at number 38, "A Perfect Day Elise" which peaked at number 25, and "The Letter" which peaked at number 28.

Since the release of Dry, Harvey has received widespread critical acclaim. In 1992, Rolling Stone named her Best New Female Singer and Best Songwriter. Among the accolades she has received are the 2001 and 2011 Mercury Prize for Stories from the City, Stories from the Sea and Let England Shake respectively—the only artist to have been awarded the prize twice—eight BRIT Award nominations, seven Grammy Award nominations, and the Outstanding Contribution To Music at the NME Awards. Two of her albums—Rid of Me and Stories from the City, Stories from the Sea—have been listed on Rolling Stone's 500 Greatest Albums of All Time list and her third studio album To Bring You My Love was named album of the year by Hot Press, People, Rolling Stone and The Village Voice.

Harvey's eighth studio album, Let England Shake, was released in 2011 to "universal acclaim". It was nominated for best album at the BRIT Awards, NME Awards, Q Awards and the South Bank Sky Arts Awards. In addition to winning album of the year at the Ivor Novello Awards and the Mercury Prize, Let England Shake was named best album of 2011 by 16 international publications and was featured on 34 other publications' year-end lists. Overall, Harvey has received 6 awards from 29 nominations.

In 2025 Harvey and co-composer Tim Phillips won the BAFTA Award for Original Music: Fiction, for their score of Apple Studios’ Bad Sisters series 2, developed by and starring Sharon Horgan. They also scored the first series, which won the 2023 BAFTA for Best Drama Series, the 2022 Peabody Award, and four Primetime Emmy nominations.

== A2IM Libera Awards ==
Year	Nominee / work	Award	Result
2012	Let England Shake	Independent Album of the Year	Nominated

== BAFTA TV Awards ==
The British Academy Television Awards recognize technical achievements in British television.

Year	Nominee / work	Award	Result
2025	Bad Sisters	Best Original Music - Fiction	Won

== Billboard Music Video Awards ==
The Billboard Music Video Awards, which celebrate achievements of the music video industry, are sponsored by Billboard magazine.

Year	Nominee / work	Award	Result
1995	"Down by the Water"	Best Alternative/Modern Rock Video	Nominated

== Brit Awards ==
The Brit Awards are the British Phonographic Industry's (BPI) annual pop music awards. Harvey has been nominated eight times

Year	Nominee / work	Award	Result	Ref.
1994	PJ Harvey	British Female Solo Artist	Nominated	
1996	PJ Harvey	British Female Solo Artist	Nominated	
1999	PJ Harvey	British Female Solo Artist	Nominated	
2001	PJ Harvey	British Female Solo Artist	Nominated	
2002	PJ Harvey	British Female Solo Artist	Nominated	
2005	PJ Harvey	British Female Solo Artist	Nominated	
2008	PJ Harvey	British Female Solo Artist	Nominated	
2012	Let England Shake	British Album of the Year	Nominated	

== Danish Music Awards ==
The Danish Music Awards is a Danish award show. The show has been arranged by IFPI since 1989.

Year	Nominee / work	Award	Result
1999	PJ Harvey	Best Foreign Female Artist	Nominated

== European Festival Awards ==
The European Festivals Awards were established in 2009. They are voted for by the public via the European Festival Awards website and receive hundreds of thousands of votes annually.

Year	Nominee / work	Award	Result	Ref.
2016	PJ Harvey	Best Headliner	Nominated	

== GAFFA Awards ==
=== Denmark GAFFA Awards ===
Delivered since 1991, the GAFFA Awards are a Danish award that rewards popular music by the magazine of the same name.

Year	Nominee / work	Award	Result	Ref.
1996	Herself	Best Foreign Female Act	Nominated	
1999	Herself	Best Foreign Female Act	Nominated	
2001	Herself	Best Foreign Female Act	Nominated	
2005	Herself	Best Foreign Female Act	Nominated	

== Groovevolt Music and Fashion Awards ==
Year	Nominee / work	Award	Result
2005	Uh Huh Her	Best Rock Album – Female	Nominated

== Grammis ==
The Grammis Awards is the Swedish music awards. The awards are considered by many in Sweden as the Swedish equivalent of the Grammy Awards. The awards ceremony is generally held each year in February in Stockholm. The awards were established in 1969 and awarded until 1972 when they were cancelled, but subsequently revived in 1987.

Year	Nominee / work	Award	Result
2012	Let England Shake	Best International Album	Nominated

== Grammy Awards ==
The Grammy Awards are awarded annually by the National Academy of Recording Arts and Sciences of the United States for outstanding achievements in the record industry. Often considered the highest music honor, the awards were established in 1958 and first presented in 1959. Harvey has received eight nominations.

Year	Nominee / work	Award	Result	Ref.
1996	"Down by the Water"	Best Female Rock Vocal Performance	Nominated	
1996	To Bring You My Love	Best Alternative Music Album	Nominated	
1999	Is This Desire?	Best Alternative Music Album	Nominated	
2002	"This is Love"	Best Female Rock Vocal Performance	Nominated	
2002	Stories from the City, Stories from the Sea	Best Rock Album	Nominated	
2005	Uh Huh Her	Best Alternative Music Album	Nominated	
2017	The Hope Six Demolition Project	Best Alternative Music Album	Nominated	
2024	I Inside the Old Year Dying	Best Alternative Music Album	Nominated	

== Helpmann Awards ==
The Helpmann Awards recognise distinguished artistic achievement and excellence in Australia's live performing arts sectors.

Year	Nominee / work	Award	Result
2017	PJ Harvey	Best International Contemporary Concert	Nominated

== Hungarian Music Awards ==
The Hungarian Music Awards is the national music awards of Hungary, held every year since 1992 and promoted by Mahasz.

Year	Nominee / work	Award	Result
2017	The Hope Six Demolition Project	Alternative Music Album of the Year	Nominated

== Ivor Novello Awards ==
The Ivor Novello Awards are awards for songwriting and composing, presented annually by the British Academy of Songwriters, Composers and Authors (BASCA). Harvey has received one award from two nominations.

Year	Nominee / work	Award	Result
2012	Let England Shake	Album of the Year	Won
2023	Bad Sisters	Best Television Soundtrack	Nominated

== Lunas del Auditorio ==
Lunas del Auditorio are sponsored by The National Auditorium in Mexico to honor the best live shows in the country.

Year	Nominee / work	Award	Result
2005	Herself	Espectaculo Alternativo	Nominated

== MOJO Awards ==
MOJO Awards are awarded by the popular British music magazine, Mojo, published monthly by Bauer. Harvey received one nomination.

Year	Nominee / work	Award	Result
2009	A Woman A Man Walked By	Best Album	Nominated

== MTV Video Music Awards ==
The MTV Video Music Awards were established in the end of the summer of 1984 by MTV to celebrate the top music videos of the year.

Year	Nominee / work	Award	Result
1995	"Down by the Water"	Best Female Video	Nominated

== Mercury Prize ==
The Mercury Prize is an annual music prize awarded for the best album from the United Kingdom and Ireland, established by the British Phonographic Industry and British Association of Record Dealers in 1992. Harvey has received two awards from four nominations and is the only artist in its history to have received the award twice.

Year	Nominee / work	Award	Result
1993	Rid of Me	Album of the Year	Nominated
1995	To Bring You My Love	Album of the Year	Nominated
2001	Stories from the City, Stories from the Sea	Album of the Year	Won
2011	Let England Shake	Album of the Year	Won

== Meteor Music Awards ==
The Meteor Music Awards are the national music awards of Ireland, distributed by MCD Productions. Harvey has received one award from three nominations.

Year	Nominee / work	Award	Result
2005	PJ Harvey	Best International Female	Won
2008	PJ Harvey	Best International Female	Nominated
2008	White Chalk	Best International Album	Nominated

== NME Awards ==
The NME Awards is an annual music awards show in the United Kingdom, founded by the music magazine NME (New Musical Express). Harvey has received five nominations. In addition, she received the Outstanding Contribution to Music award in 2011.

Year	Nominee / work	Award	Result
1996	PJ Harvey	Best Solo Artist	Nominated
1997	PJ Harvey	Best Solo Artist	Nominated
2001	PJ Harvey	Best Solo Artist	Nominated
2002	PJ Harvey	Best Solo Artist	Nominated
2012	Let England Shake	Best Album	Nominated

=== Outstanding Contribution Award ===
Year	Nominee / work	Award	Result
2011	PJ Harvey	Outstanding Contribution to Music	Honour

== Pollstar Concert Industry Awards ==
The Pollstar Concert Industry Awards aim to reward the best in the business of shows and concerts.

Year	Nominee / work	Award	Result
1993	Herself	Best New Rock Artist	Nominated
1996	Tour (w/Live)	Most Creative Stage Production	Nominated

== Q Awards ==
The Q Awards is the United Kingdom's annual music awards show, organised by the music magazine Q. Harvey has been nominated three times.

Year	Nominee / work	Award	Result
2001	Stories from the City, Stories from the Sea	Album of the Year	Nominated
2011	PJ Harvey	Best Female Artist	Nominated
2011	Let England Shake	Album of the Year	Nominated
2016	PJ Harvey	Best Solo Artist	Nominated
2016	"The Community of Hope"	Best Video	Won

== Rober Awards Music poll ==
Year	Nominee / work	Award	Result
2007	Herself	Best Live Act	Won
2008	Herself	Best Pop Act	Won
2008	Herself	Best Female Artist	Won
2011	Herself	Best Female Artist	Won
2011	Herself	Best Rock Artist	Won
2011	Herself	Best Live Artist	Won
2011	Let England Shake	Album of the Year	Won
2011	Let England Shake: 12 Short Films by Seamus Murphy	Best Promo Video	Won
2011	"The Glorious Land"	Song of the Year	Won
2016	"The Wheel"	Song of the Year	Nominated
2016	The Hope Six Demolition Project	Album of the Year	Nominated
2016	Herself	Best Rock Artist	Nominated
2016	Herself	Best Female Artist	Won
2016	Herself	Best Live Artist	Won
2018	"An Acre of Land" (with Harry Escott)	Best Cover Version	Nominated

== Shortlist Music Prize ==
The Shortlist Music Prize is a music award given annually to an album released in the United States within the last year. PJ Harvey has received one nomination.

Year	Nominee / work	Award	Result
2001	Stories from the City, Stories from the Sea	Album of the Year	Nominated

== South Bank Sky Arts Awards ==
The South Bank Sky Arts Awards is an arts award show, based on The South Bank Show and organised by Sky Arts. Harvey has received one award from two nominations..

Year	Nominee / work	Award	Result
2002	Stories from the City, Stories from the Sea	Best Pop Music Album	Won
2012	Let England Shake	Best Pop Music Album	Nominated

== UK Music Video Awards ==
The UK Music Video Awards is an annual award ceremony founded in 2008 to recognise creativity, technical excellence and innovation in music videos and moving images for music.

Year	Nominee / work	Award	Result
2016	"The Community of Hope"	Best Rock/Indie Video	Nominated

== Video Prisma Awards ==
Year	Nominee / work	Award	Result	Ref.
2023	"I Inside the Old I Dying"	Best Rock Video - International	Nominated	
2023	"I Inside the Old I Dying"	Best Animation	Nominated	

== Virgin Media Music Awards ==
Year	Nominee / work	Award	Result	Ref.
2011	PJ Harvey	Best Female	Nominated	
2011	Let England Shake	Best Album	Nominated	
2011	"Let England Shake"	Best Track	Nominated	

== Žebřík Music Awards ==
Year	Nominee / work	Award	Result	Ref.
2004	PJ Harvey	Best International Female	Nominated	
2009	PJ Harvey	Best International Female	Nominated	

== Other recognitions ==
Year	Publication	Accolade	Album	Rank
1992	Rolling Stone	Best New Female Singer	—N/a	—N/a
1992	Rolling Stone	Best Songwriter	—N/a	—N/a
1993	NME	Top 100 Greatest Albums of All Time	Dry	71
1995	Hot Press	Album of the Year	To Bring You My Love	1
1995	People	Album of the Year	To Bring You My Love	1
1995	Rolling Stone	Artist of the Year	—N/a	—N/a
1995	Rolling Stone	Albums of the Year	To Bring You My Love	1
1995	The Village Voice	Pazz & Jop Critics' List	To Bring You My Love	1
2000	Melody Maker	100 Greatest Albums of All Time	Dry	79
2002	Q	100 Women Who Rock The World	Stories from the City, Stories from the Sea	1
2002	Rolling Stone	Women Who Rock: The 50 Greatest Albums of All Time	Stories from the City, Stories from the Sea	31
2003	Rolling Stone	500 Greatest Albums of All Time	Rid of Me	405
2003	Rolling Stone	500 Greatest Albums of All Time	Stories from the City, Stories from the Sea	431
2005	1001 Albums You Must Hear Before You Die	—N/a	Dry, Rid of Me, Stories from the City, Stories from the Sea, Let England Shake	—N/a
2005	Spin	The Greatest Albums of 1985–2005	To Bring You My Love	56
2005	Spin	The 90 Greatest Albums of the '90s	To Bring You My Love	3
2006	Time	All–Time 100 Albums	Stories from the City, Stories from the Sea	—N/a
2009	NME	The Top 100 Greatest Albums of the Decade	Stories from the City, Stories from the Sea	6
2009	Pitchfork Media	The Top 200 Albums of the 2000s	Stories from the City, Stories from the Sea	124
2009	Rolling Stone	100 Best Albums of the 2000s	Stories from the City, Stories from the Sea	35
2011	BBC Music	Top 25 Albums of 2011	Let England Shake	1
2011	The Guardian	Best Albums of 2011	Let England Shake	1
2011	Hot Press	Top 30 Albums of 2011	Let England Shake	1
2011	Los Angeles Times	Best Album of 2011	Let England Shake	1
2011	Mojo	Top 50 Albums of 2011	Let England Shake	1
2011	NME	50 Best Albums of 2011	Let England Shake	1
2011	Q	Top 50 Albums of 2011	Let England Shake	2
2011	The Quietus	Albums of the Year 2011	Let England Shake	1
2011	Slant Magazine	The 25 Best Albums of 2011	Let England Shake	1
2011	Uncut	Top 50 Albums of 2011	Let England Shake	1

== See also ==
- PJ Harvey discography
