= NOS Primavera Sound 2016 =

Music festival

The NOS Primavera Sound 2016 was held on 9 to 11 June 2016 at the Parque da Cidade, Porto, Portugal. The festival was headlined by Sigur Rós, PJ Harvey and Air.

== Lineup ==
Headline performers are listed in boldface. Artists listed from latest to earliest set times.

=== NOS ===
| Thursday, 9 June | Friday, 10 June | Saturday, 11 June |
|---|---|---|
| Animal Collective; **Sigur Rós**; Deerhunter; U.S. Girls | Beach House; **PJ Harvey**; Brian Wilson performing Pet Sounds; Cass McCombs | Moderat; **Air**; Chairlift; Linda Martini |

Sigur Rós set list
1. "Óveður"
2. "Starálfur"
3. "Sæglópur"
4. "Glósóli"
5. "Vaka"
6. "Ný batterí"
7. "E-Bow"
8. "Festival"
9. "Yfirborð"
10. "Kveikur"
11. "Hafsól"

Encore

12. "Popplagið"
PJ Harvey set list
1. "Chain of Keys"
2. "The Ministry of Defence"
3. "The Community of Hope"
4. "A Line in the Sand"
5. "The Orange Monkey"
6. "Let England Shake"
7. "The Words That Maketh Murder"
8. "The Glorious Land"
9. "Medicinals"
10. "When Under Ether"
11. "Dollar, Dollar"
12. "The Wheel"
13. "The Ministry of Social Affairs"
14. "50ft Queenie"
15. "Down by the Water"
16. "To Bring You My Love"
17. "River Anacostia"
Air set list
1. "Venus"
2. "Don't Be Light"
3. "Cherry Blossom Girl"
4. "J'ai dormi sous l'eau"
5. "People in the City"
6. "Talisman"
7. "Remember"
8. "Playground Love"
9. "Alpha Beta Gaga"
10. "Radian"
11. "How Does It Make You Feel?"
12. "Kelly Watch the Stars"
13. "Sexy Boy"
14. "La femme d'argent"

=== Super Bock ===
| Thursday, 9 June | Friday, 10 June | Saturday, 11 June |
|---|---|---|
| Parquet Courts; Julia Holter; Wild Nothing; Sensible Soccers | Kiasmos; Savages; Destroyer; White Haus | Explosions in the Sky; Battles; Algiers; Manel |

=== Pitchfork ===
| Thursday, 9 June | Friday, 10 June | Saturday, 11 June |
|---|---|---|
| John Talabot; Red Axes; DJ Fra | The Blessed Madonna; Roosevelt; Holly Herndon; Protomartyr; Freddie Gibbs; Empress Of | Fort Romeau; Royal Headache; Shellac; Unsane; Titus Andronicus; Car Seat Headrest |

=== Palco. ===
| Friday, 10 June | Saturday, 11 June |
|---|---|
| Tortoise; Mudhoney; Floating Points (Live); Dinosaur Jr.; Beak>; Mueran Hermanos | Ty Segall and the Muggers; A.R. Kane; Drive Like Jehu; Autolux; Neil Michael Hagerty and the Howling Hex; Cate Le Bon |
