= Guilty (PJ Harvey song) =

Single by PJ Harvey
- Released: 13 July 2016
- Recorded: January 2015
- Studio: Somerset House (London, England)
- Genre: Alternative rock; experimental rock
- Length: 3:55
- Label: Island
- Songwriter: PJ Harvey
- Producers: Flood; John Parish

PJ Harvey singles chronology
"The Orange Monkey" (2016)	"Guilty" (2016)	"A Child's Question, August" (2023)

Audio video
- "Guilty" on YouTube

"Guilty" is a song by the English alternative rock musician PJ Harvey. Recorded during the sessions for her ninth studio album The Hope Six Demolition Project, it was released as a non-album single on 13 July 2016 on Island Records.

== Background and recording ==
"Guilty" was recorded during the sessions for PJ Harvey's ninth studio album, The Hope Six Demolition Project (2016). The sessions were held in a purpose-built studio in Somerset House in London, England, from 15 January to 14 February 2015 as part of Recording in Progress, where members of the public could observe the sessions through one-way glass at 45-minute intervals. Several publications listed "Guilty" as among the song titles written on a wall chart in the studio during the first week of the sessions, and the track was finished by the end of January, according to the single's official press release.

Flood and John Parish produced the sessions for The Hope Six Demolition Project. In a feature interview in Uncut a month prior to the album's release, Flood described the recording process of "Guilty as "fascinating" and "one of the discovery songs" where he and Parish "could push forward into a new territory." Flood was experimenting with contact microphones during the song's sessions, using them to record percussionist Kenrick Rowe's tom-tom drum and processing the signal through a whammy effects pedal. A second experiment featured Flood manipulating the pitch of the tom drum through an electric-guitar amplifier.

However, "Guilty" was not included on the final track listing of The Hope Six Demolition Project. Explaining the situation, Flood said:

"[As] the session went on, ["Guilty"] became quite a difficult song to get to the place where Polly, John and I felt it should go. By the end of the process, even though it was finished, it felt a little bit outside the rest of the material—as if it had come from a different place in time. The record felt stronger as a body of work for not having it on."

== Music and lyrics ==
"Guilty" was written by Harvey and has a length of three minutes and 55 seconds. According to the International Standard Musical Work Code database, the song's official title is "He Must Be Guilty", with "Guilty" registered as an alternate title. It has been described as "dark [and] dramatic" by Exclaim!, with Consequence of Sound adding that the subject matter of drone strikes by the United States "[calls] out the unfairness in what we label justice" and "fits well within the core concept" behind The Hope Six Demolition Project; Paste said the song's lyrics "frankly condemns what is believed to be justice and equality in the global perspective."

Harvey's vocals on "Guilty" are in a lower register than most of her recordings on White Chalk (2007), Let England Shake (2011) and The Hope Six Demolition Project, on which she "predominantly used her hauntingly distanced upper register rather than the gravelly blues-steeped style" of her earlier material, according to Flavorwire.

== Release and reception ==
"Guilty" was released as a non-album single on 13 July 2016; it was released only as a digital download. The single's cover art features a black-and-white photograph of a sculpture of a two-headed dog (possibly Cerberus); the artwork was designed by Michelle Henning, who was the art director and cover-art designer of The Hope Six Demolition Project.

Critical response to "Guilty" was largely positive. Les Inrockuptibles referred to the song "intense and lyrical" and said it was a "perfect bonus that extends an already impeccable record [The Hope Six Demolition Project]."

== Track listing ==
Digital download

1. "Guilty" (PJ Harvey) – 3:55

== Personnel ==
All personnel credits adapted from Deezer.

Performers

- PJ Harvey – vocals
- Terry Edwards – guitar
- Flood – background vocals
- Enrico Gabrielli – basset clarinet
- James Johnston – background vocals
- John Parish – bass, piano, synthesiser, percussion, background vocals
- Kenrick Rowe – percussion, background vocals
- Alessandro Stefana – guitar, background vocals

Technical personnel

- Flood – production, mixing
- John Parish – production
- Adam "Cecil" Bartlett – recording, mix engineering
- Caesar Edmunds – mix engineering
- Rob Kirwan – recording
- Drew Smith – mixing
- John Dent – mastering

Design personnel

- Michelle Henning – artwork
