= Wake Christian Academy =

Segregation academy in North Carolina

Location
- 5500 Wake Academy Drive; Raleigh, North Carolina 27603; United States; 35°42′17″N 78°40′8″W

Information
- Other name: WCA
- Type: Private school
- Motto: That Christ might be first
- Religious affiliation: Christian
- Established: 1966
- NCES School ID: 01012616
- Head of school: Mike Woods
- Teaching staff: 62.4 (on an FTE basis)
- Grades: K–12
- Gender: Co-educational
- Enrollment: 896 (2017–2018)
- Student to teacher ratio: 14.4
- Colors: Navy and white
- Nickname: Bulldogs
- Website: www.wakechristianacademy.com

Wake Christian Academy (WCA) is a private, Christian, co-educational school in Raleigh, North Carolina, United States. It was established in 1966 as a segregation academy in response to the racial integration of public schools. The academy enrolls students from Kindergarten through 12th grade and is divided into three divisions.

== History ==
Wake Christian Academy was established in 1966 as Wake Academy by a group of segregationists that included L. C. Purdy, a former president of White Citizens' Councils. Purdy, along with the White Citizens' Council, tried to raise funds in time to open a school building in the fall of 1966, but fell short and had to lease a residence in which to operate the school. School board president H.W. Carey, referencing the founding of the school, told the News & Observer that he "hope[ed] the school would be known for its quality education, but it would be false if I said integration didn't enter into it".

In 1969, Purdy told a reporter that "all you get in public schools is integration, not education. The children are pawns in sociological experiments". Principal Mrs. Franklin Pierce said that although the school was formed to maintain segregation, she was seeking to change the school's image.

In 1970, North Carolina Supreme Court justice I. Beverly Lake Jr. gave a speech to students and parents at the school in which he denounced school desegregation. Lake noted "the products of jungles" were enrolling in public education and opined that all white private schools like Wake Christian Academy "offer to our state her best hope for safe passage through perilous times." In May 1970, school founder L. C. Purdy was also a leader of the local chapter of the White Citizens Council and campaigned against a public school bond issue on the grounds the funds would "be used more [for] integration than for education."

In June 1971, following an IRS directive for the pre-schools to advertise a racially nondiscriminatory admissions policy, board member L. C. Purdy initially told a reporter that he was not aware of any such notice being received by the school. He later added, “we are not going [to] let the federal government dictate our admissions policies, even if it means losing our tax-exempt status.” The following month, Purdy told a reporter that no Black students had applied to the school, adding, “All students have to have fine educational qualifications or we won’t talk to them.”

In 1973, a News and Observer article reported that two Wake County private schools had previously lost their federal tax-exempt status due to findings of racial discrimination. In 1980, Midway Christian Schools merged into Wake Christian.

== Academics and accreditation ==
Wake Christian Academy enrolls over 900 students from central North Carolina, including Wake, Johnston, and Harnett counties. It holds accreditations from the Association of Christian Schools International (ACSI) and Cognia. The school provides a traditional college-preparatory curriculum for kindergarten through 12th grade, including instruction in Spanish, science, mathematics, history, and Bible studies, with options for honors, Advanced Placement, and dual-enrollment courses.

== Extracurricular activities ==
=== Athletics ===
On September 16, 2015, the school officially opened a new field house known as the Fidelity Bank Field House, in a ribbon-cutting ceremony at the school. It would support its football, baseball, softball, and soccer programs, and includes an on-site gym for athletic training and conditioning. The athletic department of the school offers 13 sports for both boys and girls and fields 43 teams. The school is a member of the North Carolina Independent Schools Athletic Association (NCISAA) and competes in the 3A division, as well as the Capital City Conference. The institution promotes philanthropy through athletic competition.

=== Fine Arts ===
Wake Christian Academy provides a fine arts program which includes art, band, drama, and chorus. The school's marching band, known as the Bulldog Regiment, regularly participates in the Raleigh Christmas Parade. The music program also includes a winter drum line, concert band, symphonic wind ensemble, and jazz band.

== Tuition and admissions ==
The academy admits students from kindergarten to grade 12 and the process includes campus tours, applications, assessments, and interviews. Tuition varies by grade level, and financial aid is available through state scholarships and internal programs.

== Community outreach ==
Wake Christian Academy partners with several local ministries for community outreach, including Community of Hope, Child Evangelism Fellowship, and With Love From Jesus, providing food, clothing, and Christmas gifts to families in need.
