= The Words That Maketh Murder =

Single by PJ Harvey

from the album Let England Shake
- B-side: "The Guns Called Me Back Again"
- Released: 6 February 2011
- Recorded: April–May 2010
- Studio: Eype Church in Dorset, United Kingdom
- Genre: Alternative rock; folk rock
- Length: 3:45
- Label: Island
- Songwriter(s): PJ Harvey
- Producer(s): Flood; John Parish; Mick Harvey; PJ Harvey

PJ Harvey singles chronology
"The Devil" (2008)	"The Words That Maketh Murder" (2011)	"The Glorious Land" (2011)

Music video
- "The Words That Maketh Murder" on YouTube

"The Words That Maketh Murder" is a song by English musician PJ Harvey. It is the fourth track and lead single from her eighth studio album, Let England Shake, and was released on 6 February 2011 on Island Records. Dealing with diplomacy, the ongoing conflicts in Afghanistan and world wars, "The Words That Maketh Murder" was produced by Flood, John Parish, Mick Harvey and PJ Harvey. It was Harvey's first single since 2008's "The Devil" and uses similar dynamics of song-writing to its predecessor, including folk influence and instrumentation.

Upon its release, "The Words That Maketh Murder" received positive critical acclaim, although it failed to chart. An accompanying music video, directed by Seamus Murphy, was released prior to the single in January 2011 and was the second part of a twelve film project documenting Let England Shake.

== Origin and recording ==
The song was written after the release of PJ Harvey's seventh studio album, White Chalk, in 2007. The lyrics to the song were written prior to the music, as Harvey used this technique with all the songs written for the album, citing it as "the starting point" and explaining that it is "the root level" of her style of song-writing. Recorded during the sessions for Let England Shake, the song was recorded over a five-week period in April and May 2010 with long-time collaborators John Parish and Mick Harvey, and, like other songs on the album, was recorded live so that Parish and Harvey could "bring their feelings into it."

== Composition and lyrics ==
"The Words That Maketh Murder"
Harvey's distinctive use of autoharp and Eddie Cochran-influenced refrain are featured in "The Words That Maketh Murder", as well as John Parish and Mick Harvey's live background vocals.

As with all her compositions on Let England Shake, Harvey's main instrument on "The Words That Maketh Murder" is an autoharp. Its main underlying minor chord (Em) is prominent throughout the song, while the chord progression in the verses consists of a further three chords (A-G-F#/D) reverting to the minor chord. The chorus uses a contrasting major chord (G) as well as a flat chord (B♭) and another minor chord (Dm) and, like the song's final refrain, finishes on a standard chord (C). A saxophone and trombone, played by Harvey, are also featured during the chorus.

Lyrically, the song refers to the ongoing Afghan war and also makes several allusions to World War I and World War II. The lyrics also criticise diplomacy, especially in the final refrain: "what if I take my problem to the United Nations?" This refrain is based on a lyric from Eddie Cochran's "Summertime Blues" and most reviews of Let England Shake recognised the similarity. Harvey was granted permission to use the lyric and noted the inclusion in the album's liner notes.

== Release ==
"The Words That Maketh Murder" was released to British radio in early January 2011 and was premiered by Zane Lowe on BBC Radio 1 on 11 January 2011. At the time, there were no plans to release a single of the song domestically; however, it was announced in early February that the song would be issued as a single. Released digitally on 6 February, and as a 7" vinyl on 7 February, the song accompanied Harvey's appearances with John Wilson on BBC Radio 4's Front Row. It was eventually featured as the fourth track on Let England Shake, released on 14 February 2011. The song was also heavily promoted through in-studio radio performances by Harvey.

== Critical reception ==
Critical reception of the song, as well as the album, was positive. Rolling Stone described the song as "fairly peppy for a PJ Harvey song about murder" and rated it three stars out of five. In Pitchfork Media's review of Let England Shake, Scott Plagenhoef stated that "Harvey blackly and comically shakes her head at those post-WWI diplomatic hopes" and described it as "a hilariously depressing coda; her song's character has experienced the unimaginable and is looking to an international peacekeeping body for help." Plagenhoef also cited it as the album's key song, alongside "Written on the Forehead." The Guardian described the song as "a masterstroke" and stated "Harvey clearly understands that the horror doesn't really need embellishing: her way sounds infinitely more shocking and affecting than all the machine-gun sound effects in the world." Patti Smith, to whom Harvey has been compared in the past by critics, hailed the single. Speaking to The Guardian in January 2011, Smith said: "It just makes me happy to exist. Whenever anyone does something of worth, including myself, it just makes me happy to be alive. So I listened to that song all morning, totally happy."

== Music video ==
After viewing Seamus Murphy's award-winning "A Darkness Visible" exhibition in London in 2008, which she noted as having "an emotional impact", and purchasing his book, Harvey contacted Murphy as she "wanted to speak to him more about his experiences being there in Afghanistan." Murphy saw Harvey perform and the collaboration began with her requesting him to take promotional photographs for Let England Shake in July 2010. In addition to the album's photography, originally Harvey and Murphy planned to record a documentary of the recording process of the album; however, instead, twelve short films, one for each of the album's songs, were made. Each film incorporates a mix of still photography and video documenting the album's themes "in the manner of classic photographic reportage - recording real & spontaneous situations." Murphy travelled throughout England alone "with little equipment", due to a low budget and lack of assistants, and after photography, directing and producing the films solely by himself, edited the final product in Berlin, Germany with video editor Sebastian Gollek.

The music video for "The Words That Maketh Murder" follows the same dynamic as Murphy's other videos for Let England Shake; however rather than still photography, it incorporates segments of PJ Harvey rehearsing the song on an autoharp. The opening scene shows street lights through a car windshield, and during the first verse aptly shows a soldier walking through an open field and later dead in the middle of a road during the lyric "I've seen soldiers fall like lumps of meat." Further military imagery is used, specifically showing soldiers in formal uniform and children playing a war-related video game. Other scenes in the video show a funfair and clips from a gig at the 1in12 club in Bradford; however, one of the video's most notable scenes, according to Pitchfork Media, is a ballroom scene. Filmed in Blackpool, it is described by Murphy as "one of his favourites." A still image from this scene is also featured on the single's artwork.

The video was released online on 13 January 2011 on Norwegian website Lydverket; however, it was later removed for unknown reasons. It was re-released on Dailymotion the following day and on YouTube on 17 January. A high definition version of the video was released on 15 March 2011.

== Live performances ==
Although Harvey had previously performed a number of songs from the album in 2009, "The Words That Maketh Murder" was debuted live at La Maroquinerie in Paris, France on 14 February 2011, her first live performance to promote Let England Shake. This performance was also broadcast live as a webcast through a number of online sites, including the concert's promoter Deezer Offline. The performance was shortly followed by an in-studio radio session for Geoff Lloyd's Hometime Show on Absolute Radio on 17 February, and later for a BBC Radio 1 session at the famous Maida Vale Studios hosted by Rob da Bank on 19 February. The song was also performed live at the 2011 NME Awards at the O2 Academy, Brixton in London on 23 February 2011 where Harvey also received the award for Outstanding Contribution to Music. The song has been performed at all of Harvey's live shows on the European leg of the Let England Shake tour throughout February and March 2011. The performances of the song feature Harvey on autoharp, John Parish on steel guitar, Jean-Marc Butty on drums and percussion, and Mick Harvey performing bass and then later switching to keyboards. In further promotion, the song was performed on Later... with Jools Holland on 26 April 2011 alongside "Let England Shake" and "The Glorious Land."

== Track listing ==
Digital download and 7"

1. "The Words That Maketh Murder" – 3:45
2. "The Guns Called Me Back Again" – 2:44

== Credits and personnel ==
All personnel credits adapted from Let England Shake's liner notes.

Performers

- PJ Harvey – vocals, autoharp, saxophone, producer, layout, design
- John Parish – guitar, trombone, percussion, backing vocals, producer
- Mick Harvey – bass, bass harmonica, drums, percussion, backing vocals, producer

Technical

- Flood – producer, mixing
- Rob Kirwan – engineer, recording
- Catherine Marks – mixing assistant
- John Catlin – mixing assistant
- Rob Crane – layout, design
- Seamus Murphy – photography

== Release history ==
Region	Date	Format	Label	Catalog
Worldwide	6 February 2011	Digital download	Island	—
United Kingdom	7 February 2011	Digital download, 7"	Island	2762434
