= Thou (Belgian band) =

Ghent rock band

- Origin: Ghent, Belgium
- Genres: Alternative rock; pop rock; trip hop
- Years active: 1997–present
- Labels: Brinkman; PIAS Recordings
- Members: Does de Wolf; Bart Vincent; Pim de Wolf; Bart Depoortere; Geert De Waegeneer; Hans Rabaey
- Past members: Kurt De Vylder (drums, percussion, Rhodes)
- Website: www.thoumusic.free.fr

Thou is a Belgian rock band from Ghent. The band consists of Does de Wolf (vocals, organ), Bart Vincent (vocals, guitar), Pim de Wolf (guitar), Bart Depoortere (bass), Kurt De Vylder (drums, percussion, Rhodes) until January 2000, Geert De Waegeneer (drums) from January 2000, and Hans Rabaey (sound engineer).

== History ==
Thou released its first EP Une Poupee Pour M'amuser in 1997, which was followed by the debut album, Hello in This Sun, in 1998. Amidst of the Portishead comparisons, the band recorded their second studio album and U.S. debut, Put Us in Tune, at Portishead's home studio. The band also used Portishead's unused rhythm tracks for their own songs. The album featured contributions from violinist Richard Hunt, Roni Size bass guitarist Si John, and Belgian musician Mauro Pawlowski, as well as PJ Harvey contributor John Parish.

The band released their third album, Elvis Or Betty Boop in 2001.

== Style ==
The band's style has been described as dreamy, "dramatic pop with post-trip-hop beats" and has been compared to those of Portishead, T. Rex and early Yo La Tengo. Allmusic critic Thom Jurek observed that the band's music touches "everything from trip-hop, cheesy French pop, St. Etienne, and Stereolab." Jurek also noted the influence of "early Prince, Soundgarden and the lilting dainty pop of the Boo Radleys" on the album.

== Band members ==
- Does de Wolf – vocals, organ
- Bart Vincent – vocals, guitar
- Pim de Wolf – guitar
- Bart Depoortere – bass
- Kurt De Vylder - drums, percussion, Rhodes (until 2000)
- Geert De Waegeneer – drums
- Hans Rabaey – sound engineer

== Discography ==
Studio albums

- Hello in This Sun (1998)
- Put Us in Tune (2000)
- Elvis or Betty Boop (2002)
- I Like Girls in Russia (2004)

EPs

- Une Poupée Pour M'Amuser (1997)
