= Mazgani =

Shahryar Mazgani
- Born: 1974 (age 51–52)
- Genres: Alternative; Indie rock
- Years active: 2004–present
- Members: Shahryar Mazgani; Sérgio Mendes; Victor Coimbra; Isaac Achega
- Website: Official artist site.

Mazgani is an Iranian-Portuguese singer-songwriter. He was born in Iran in 1974. In 1979, when the revolution took place in Iran, he and his family emigrated to Portugal.

In 2005, Mazgani was considered by the French magazine Les Inrockuptibles as one of the best 20 new European artists. His debut album, Song of the New Heart, released in 2007, contains 13 songs sung in English. Song of the New Heart was released to critical acclaim. Mazgani's strong charismatic stage presence and delivery immediately established him as one of the most respected and sought after performers in his home territory.

In 2009, netlabel OptimusDiscos^{1} in Portugal released the Tell the People EP, produced by Pedro Gonçalves of Dead Combo. Also in 2009, Mazgani came third in the International Songwriting Competition, AAA category, with the song "Somewhere Beneath This Sky"^{3}; the competition judges included Tom Waits, Robert Smith, and other alternative music notables. Tell The People was released as Mazgani's first international approach, “Ladies and Gentlemen introducing… Mazgani, which featured all five EP tracks alongside five tracks from his debut album. It was released in the Benelux, Finland, Scandinavia, Canada and Australia.

His second full-length album, Song of Distance, was released in Portugal in April 2010 and that release was followed by a digital UK release via AWAL in October. It was produced by Dead Combo's Pedro V. Goncalves and Helder Nelson. The record hit no. 17 on the Portuguese charts. Mazgani toured extensively in several European territories, playing festivals in the Netherlands, Italy and France, as well as shows in Spain, Denmark and Sweden. These live performances were documented by Rui Pedro Tendinha in his road movie “The Road to Mazgani”. The documentary premiere was at the IndieLisboa 2012 Film Festival.

In that same year, the songwriter composed and directed the original musical score for a theatre adaptation of Bertolt Brecht's “Mr. Puntila and His Man Matti”, one of the most successful productions in Portugal in many years, winner of several awards including the “SIC Golden Globe Award” (Globo de Ouro SIC).

His new record Common Ground was released in April 2013 and climbed directly to Number 2 in the iTunes Portugal Top 10. It was produced by John Parish - with the collaboration of Mick Harvey (Nick Cave & The Bad Seeds), and was recorded and mixed in Bristol. The album was immediately considered an “instant classic” (Blitz Magazine, June 2013) and helped broaden his audience. The first single, Distant Gardens was released in January 2013 and went on to be included on the most important playlists of Portuguese radio stations.

Lifeboat is his new record, out April 13th (2015) and includes reinterpretations of songs by PJ Harvey, Elvis Presley, Cole Porter, Bee Gees, Lee Hazlewood, amongst others.

== Members ==
2015

- Shahryar Mazgani (vocalist and electrical guitar)
- Sérgio Sousa (electrical guitar)
- Victor Coimbra (bass)
- Isaac Achega (drums)
- João Gomes (keyboards)

== Influences ==
Mazgani has mentioned in interviews the following musical influences:

- Leonard Cohen
- Bob Dylan
- Nina Simone

== Discography ==
=== Albums ===
- Song of the New Heart (Independent, 2007)
- Song Of Distance (Vachier, 2010)
- Common Ground (Independent, 2013)
- Lifeboat (Sony Music, 2015)
- The Poet's Death (Sony Music, 2017)

=== EPs ===
- Tell The People (Optimus Discos, 2009)
- Ladies and Gentlemen, introducing Mazgani (Fading Ways, 2009)
- Mercy (live promo EP, Tell the People, 2011)

== Sources ==
- Official Site
- Portuguese Netlabel
- ISC website
- Portuguese Agency
- Dutch Agency
