= Elliot Green =

English footballer

Personal information
- Date of birth: 5 October 1993 (age 33)
- Place of birth: Lincoln, England
- Height: 1.54 m (5 ft 1/2 in)
- Position: Defender

Youth career
- –2012: Lincoln City

Senior career*
Years	Team	Apps	(Gls)
2012–2013	Lincoln City	0	(0)
2012	→ Eastwood Town (loan)		
2012	→ Stamford (loan)		
2012	→ Sheffield FC (loan)		
2013	→ Grantham Town (loan)		
2014–2015	Ånge IF	10	(0)
2015	→ Gällivare Malmbergets FF (loan)	5	(0)
2015	→ Sollefteå GIF FF (loan)	8	(0)
2016	Whitecaps FC 2	11	(0)
2016–2018	Guiseley	10	(0)
2018	→ Alfreton Town (loan)	3	(0)
2019	Adelaide City	9	(0)
- * Club domestic league appearances and goals as of 26 August 2019

Elliot Green (born 5 October 1993) is an English footballer who plays as a defender for Adelaide City.

== Career ==
Green began his career at his local side Lincoln City in 2012, before spending time at various non-league sides in England. He moved to Sweden in 2014 with Ånge IF, before moving to Gällivare Malmbergets FF and Sollefteå GIF FF in 2015. He signed with United Soccer League side Whitecaps FC 2 on 10 February 2016.

On 20 January 2019, Green joined NPL South Australia side Adelaide City.
