= Dance Hall at Louse Point =

Studio album by PJ Harvey and John Parish
- Released: 23 September 1996
- Recorded: 12 February – 10 March 1996
- Studios: Small World in Yeovil, United Kingdom
- Genres: Alternative rock, experimental rock, art rock
- Length: 39:47
- Label: Island
- Producers: John Parish, PJ Harvey, Mick Harvey

PJ Harvey and John Parish chronology
Dance Hall at Louse Point (1996)	A Woman a Man Walked By (2009)

PJ Harvey chronology
To Bring You My Love (1995)	Dance Hall at Louse Point (1996)	Is This Desire? (1998)

Professional ratings
Review scores
Source	Rating
AllMusic	3/5 stars
The A.V. Club	(unfavourable)
Entertainment Weekly	A
NME	(8/10)
Pitchfork Media	(6.3/10)
Q Magazine	3/5 stars
Robert Christgau	(2-star Honorable Mention)
Rolling Stone	2/5 stars
Spin	(7/10)

Dance Hall at Louse Point is the debut collaborative studio album by English alternative rock musicians PJ Harvey and John Parish, released on 23 September 1996 on Island Records. It was reissued on vinyl LP in October 2020.

== Background ==
Parish wrote and played the music, while Harvey sang vocals and wrote the lyrics. The pair had been musical collaborators for several years before making this album together – as a teenager growing up in rural England, Harvey contributed saxophone, guitar and backing vocals to Parish's band Automatic Dlamini before forming her own band in 1991. Parish later served as co-producer, guitarist, percussionist and keyboard player on Harvey's 1995 album To Bring You My Love, and would also feature heavily on her 1998 album Is This Desire?.

The album was viewed by many PJ Harvey fans as a minor side project – perhaps due to the top billing accorded the more obscure Parish and her own accreditation as Polly Jean Harvey rather than the more widely recognised PJ Harvey name. The album consequently sold more poorly than any of her solo releases, entering the UK Albums Chart at number 46 and barely denting the U.S. Billboard chart at number 178 for one week. It yielded only one single, "That Was My Veil", which spent a week at number 75 in the UK Singles Chart. Harvey later admitted that she left all promotional duties for the record to Parish because she was exhausted following a year of intense promotional activity for her own To Bring You My Love album in 1995. Reportedly, bosses at Harvey's Island Records label feared the avant-garde venture was "commercial suicide", despite it winning generally positive reviews: Entertainment Weekly opined, "This is 'deep' music in every sense; total immersion is recommended", Musician reckoned "The results are as engaging as they are disturbing....full of strange moves and unusual textures", Logo felt it was "thrillingly sinister", while Q magazine praised its "polecat scat and brooding rural blues", adding that it felt "more a series of themes and word paintings."

Speaking about the album to NME in 1998, Harvey explained "I just really wanted to learn different things, and a lot of learning comes from working with other people. I tend to place more importance on lyric writing than music, and I wanted to somehow bring the music to a similar level with that, but I didn’t feel confident in myself as a musician to do it. I know John can write demanding and intellectual music, much more than mine, which is very simple. So it was really just to test my lyric writing." In 2001 she told Chicago Sun-Times, "People don't even count that, yet that's the record I'm really proud of. It was an enormous turning point. Lyrically, it moved me into areas I'd never been to before. Faced with John's music, which is so different to my own, it just made me write lyrics in a very different way and structure songs in a different way."

Parish and Harvey did a brief UK club tour with the Mark Bruce Dance Company in early 1997, performing the album's experimental songs with a group of interpretive ballet dancers onstage.

In 2009 Parish and Harvey released their second collaborative album A Woman a Man Walked By.

== Track listing ==
All tracks composed by PJ Harvey and John Parish, except where noted. Track titles feature appended parenthetical place names.

1. "Girl" (Bristol) – 1:29
2. "Rope Bridge Crossing" (Dorset) – 5:10
3. "City of No Sun" (Tokyo) – 2:14
4. "That Was My Veil" (Modena) – 3:01
5. "Urn with Dead Flowers in a Drained Pool" (Modena) – 3:03
6. "Civil War Correspondent" (Stockholm) – 4:23
7. "Taut" (Washington D.C.) – 3:15
8. "Un Cercle Autour du Soleil" (Stockholm) – 5:07
9. "Heela" (Dorset) – 3:19
10. "Is That All There Is?" (Jerry Leiber and Mike Stoller) – 5:11
11. "Dance Hall at Louse Point" (Bristol) – 2:10
12. "Lost Fun Zone" (Tokyo) – 1:27

== Personnel ==
- John Dent – Mastering
- Mick Harvey – Organ, Bass, Guitar (10), Bass (Electric), Drums, Producer
- PJ Harvey – Producer, vocals & lyrics
- John Parish – Producer, Engineer, all instruments
