= When Under Ether =

Single by PJ Harvey

from the album White Chalk
- B-side: "Wait"
- Released: 17 September 2007
- Recorded: November 2006–January 2007
- Genre: Alternative rock; folk rock
- Length: 2:25
- Label: Island
- Songwriter: PJ Harvey
- Producers: Flood; John Parish; PJ Harvey

PJ Harvey singles chronology
"Shame" (2004)	"When Under Ether" (2007)	"The Piano" (2007)

Music video
- "When Under Ether" on YouTube

"When Under Ether" is a song written by PJ Harvey for her album White Chalk (2007). It was released as the album's first single in September 2007. This song was #32 on Rolling Stone's list of the 100 Best Songs of 2007 and reached number 101 in the UK Singles Chart.

== Release ==
"When Under Ether" was released as the lead single for White Chalk on 17 September 2007, in both digital download and limited edition 7" vinyl formats. The b-side is "Wait", a song which Harvey composed and recorded in 1988, rumoured to be one of her first recordings.

== Composition ==
Harvey wrote "When Under Ether" and produced it along with Flood and John Parish. It is set in common time (4/4) and composed in the key of F minor. Throughout the course of the song, Harvey's vocal range spans over one octave from C_{4}-A♭_{4}.

According to critic Joshua Klein, "the simple repetitive pattern that gently drives 'When Under Ether' drips with menace." Drums, autoharp, and organ accompany the main components of the song and are low in the mix.

One critic suggests the song is an account of a "harrowing" birth under archaic medical conditions, while other critics such as Heather Phares hint that they "quite possibly" refer to "abortion, since unwanted children are some of the many broken family ties that haunt the album". When asked directly during an interview in The Guardian, Harvey replied, "That's obviously what you hear, but for me it's not actually tied to anything specific, like an abortion. These aren't just words. They're songs. They inhabit themselves, really".

== Track listings ==
UK 7" single (1747513)

1. "When Under Ether" – 2:25
2. "Wait" – 2:17

US promotional CD (N/A)

1. "When Under Ether" – 2:25
2. "Wait" – 2:17
3. Interviews – 14:32

EU promotional CD (WHENCDPRO1)

1. "When Under Ether" – 2:25

== Personnel ==
All personnel credits adapted from the album's liner notes.

Musicians

- PJ Harvey – vocals, piano, acoustic guitar
- John Parish – drums, acoustic guitar
- Eric Drew Feldman – keyboards

Technical personnel

- Flood – producer, engineer, mixing
- John Parish – producer, mixing
- PJ Harvey – producer, mixing, additional engineer
- Catherine Marks – assistant engineer
- Andrew Savors – assistant engineer
- Ali Chant – additional engineer
- John Dent – mastering

Design personnel

- Maria Mochnacz – artwork, photography

== Charts ==
Chart (2007)	Peak position
UK Singles Chart	101
