= Community of Hope =

Nonprofit organization based in Washington, D.C., United States

The Community of Hope is a nonprofit based in the District of Columbia focusing on providing health services and assisting unhoused families. It was founded in 1980 and has since grown to a staff of over 300. They have partnered with the District government. They have acquired an existing clinic, as well as running their own established clinics for general, dental, psychological, and maternal health. They offer temporary housing for unhoused families.

== Trivia ==
PJ Harvey's song "The Community of Hope" is based on a tour of Southeast DC by the Community of Hope's original location.
