= The Glorious Land =

Single by PJ Harvey

from the album Let England Shake
- B-side: "The Nightingale"
- Released: 18 April 2011
- Recorded: April–May 2010
- Studio: Eype Church (Dorset, UK)
- Genre: Alternative rock; experimental rock
- Length: 3:34
- Label: Island; Vagrant
- Songwriter(s): PJ Harvey
- Producer(s): Flood; John Parish; Mick Harvey; PJ Harvey

PJ Harvey singles chronology
"The Words That Maketh Murder" (2011)	"The Glorious Land" (2011)	"The Wheel" (2016)

Music video
- "The Glorious Land" on YouTube

"The Glorious Land" is a song by the English alternative rock musician PJ Harvey. The song was released as the second single from her eighth studio album, Let England Shake, on 18 April 2011. An accompanying music video, directed by Seamus Murphy, was recorded and was released in March 2011, prior to the single release. It is the fourth part of a twelve-part music-film project documenting Let England Shake.

== Origin and recording ==
The song was written after the release of PJ Harvey's seventh studio album, White Chalk, in 2007. It is also known that the lyrics to the song were written prior to the music, as Harvey used this technique with all the songs written for the album, citing it as "the starting point" and explaining that it is "the root level" of her style of song-writing. Recorded during the sessions for Let England Shake, the song was recorded over a five-week period in April and May 2010 with long-time collaborators John Parish and Mick Harvey, and, like other songs on the album, was recorded live so that Parish and Harvey could "bring their feelings into it."

== Composition and lyrics ==
Although the majority of the songs on White Chalk, and Let England Shake's first single, "The Words That Maketh Murder", feature an autoharp, "The Glorious Land" is primarily arranged for guitar, with the accompaniment of electronica beats. The guitar uses a capo on the eighth fret. It features a standard chord progression throughout the course of the song (Em-Bm-G/C-Am-D). Similarly, the bridge uses the first two chords. The song's final refrain alternates the basic chord progression (Em-A-Bm) and finishes on an Em. An extract of the song is based on "The Bed's Too Big Without You", a song by The Police, written by Sting. The bugle call sampled throughout the song is "Regimental March", performed by HM Irish Guards.

Lyrically, the song refers to militarism and the ongoing Afghan war. The lyrics in the final refrain appear to refer to the disastrous effects of war: "What is the glorious fruit of our land? / the fruit is deformed children / what is the glorious fruit of our land / the fruit is orphaned children." Alex Denney of The Quietus noted that the final refrain is "a chilling finale" to the song. Several lyrics throughout the song ("How is our glorious country ploughed? Not by iron ploughs") are extracts from an untitled Russian folk song anthologised in Russian Folk Songs by Vladimir Yakovlevich Propp and translated by Roberta Reeder. Other translated lyrics from the same song mimic lyrics from "The Glorious Land" such as "Our land is being ploughed by horses' hooves; And the glorious land is being sown with Cossack heads." These reworked lyrics, however, were noted by Harvey as a credit on Let England Shake.

== Release ==
The plan to release "The Glorious Land" as a domestic single was announced on 7 March 2011, almost a month after the release of Let England Shake. Although initial reports claimed that it was only to be released on 7" vinyl, an official announcement on PJ Harvey's web site and Facebook page confirmed it would also be available as a digital download. The b-side, "The Nightingale", is an outtake from the album's recording sessions and was also featured on limited edition releases of the album. The song was released on 16 April in Ireland and two days later in the United Kingdom and United States. "The Glorious Land" is the third track on the album Let England Shake, which was released on 14 February 2011.

== Critical reception ==
The Independent recognised the political aspect of the song and stated that it "could be a partisan anthem from Vietnam or Palestine or any comparable resistance movement." The Quietus referred to the song as "almost shoegazy in tone" with an "overall aquatic feel", also noting its "linking war with [England's] agricultural heritage", and cited the song's overall composition as "a pleasure to see such obvious effort being made in the service of ideas as good as this".

== Live performances ==
Although Harvey had previously performed a number of songs from the album in 2009, "The Glorious Land" was debuted live at La Maroquinerie in Paris, France, on 14 February 2011, her first live performance to promote Let England Shake. This performance was also broadcast live as a webcast through a number of online sites, including the concert's promoter Deezer Offline. The song has been performed at all of Harvey's live shows on the European leg of the Let England Shake tour throughout February and March 2011. The performances of the song feature Harvey on electric guitar, John Parish on keyboards and percussion, Jean-Marc Butty on drums and percussion, and Mick Harvey performance rhodes. In further promotion, the song was performed on Later... with Jools Holland on 26 April 2011 alongside "Let England Shake" and "The Words That Maketh Murder." The song has been performed live during the three-day festival Rock en Seine, parc de Saint Cloud, 26 August 2017 at 11.00 pm.

== Music video ==
After viewing Seamus Murphy's award-winning "A Darkness Visible" exhibition in London in 2008, which she noted as having "an emotional impact", and purchasing his book, Harvey contacted Murphy as she "wanted to speak to him more about his experiences being there in Afghanistan." Murphy saw Harvey perform and the collaboration began with her requesting him to take promotional photographs for Let England Shake in July 2010. In addition to the album's photography, originally Harvey and Murphy planned to record a documentary of the recording process of the album; however, instead, twelve short films, one for each of the album's songs, were made. Each film incorporates a mix of still photography and video documenting the album's themes "in the manner of classic photographic reportage – recording real & spontaneous situations." Murphy travelled throughout England alone "with little equipment", due to a low budget and lack of assistants, and after photographing, directing and producing the films solely by himself, edited the final product in Berlin, Germany with video editor Sebastian Gollek.

The music video for "The Glorious Land" is similar in style to Murphy's other videos for Let England Shake. It was premiered on 9 March 2011 on YouTube and Dailymotion alongside "The Last Living Rose," "The Words That Maketh Murder" and "Let England Shake" as the fourth instalment of the twelve-film project. The video opens with a silent moving image of a tree in Dorset in October 2010 and then Harvey rehearsing the introduction to the song, as seen in the other films for the album. The introduction of the song features images of trees, shot looking upwards during a car journey. The rest of the video also incorporates clips of Harvey performing the song, a mud track with smoke (shown alongside the lyric "our land is ploughed by tanks and feet") and overlapped shots of Harvey's rehearsal space in a panoramic fashion. The video ends with another image of a withered tree in a field. Murphy explained the origins and imagery of the video in an interview with music blog Stereoboard. He said that he intended "to avoid too literal an interpretation of Polly's lyrics, but to try to remain true to the spirit and feel of the track." He also noted that the "Autumn colours, the sunlight streaming through the trees, the effect of movement during driving, how things changed if I speeded up or slowed down" influenced the video's direction and how some shots were "deliberately overexposed and out of focus" in order "to increase the abstraction."

The video was released online on 8 March 2011 on YouTube. A high definition version of the video was released on 15 March 2011.

== Track listing ==
Digital download and 7" vinyl

1. "The Glorious Land" – 3:34
2. "The Nightingale" – 4:14

== Release history ==
Region	Date	Format
Ireland	16 April 2011	7" vinyl
Worldwide	18 April 2011	Digital download
United Kingdom	18 April 2011	Digital download, 7" vinyl

== Musicians and personnel ==
Musicians

- PJ Harvey – vocals, guitar
- John Parish – guitar, percussion, backing vocals
- Mick Harvey – rhodes, backing vocals
- Jean-Marc Butty – drums, backing vocals

Technical personnel

- Flood – producer, mixing
- Rob Kirwin – engineer, recording
- Catherine Marks – mixing assistant
- John Catlin – mixing assistant
- John Parish – additional producer
- Mick Harvey – additional producer
- PJ Harvey – additional producer
