= A Woman a Man Walked By =

Studio album by PJ Harvey and John Parish
- Released: 27 March 2009
- Recorded: January 2006 – September 2008
- Studio: Toybox Studios and Honorsound in Bristol, United Kingdom and Hothead Studios in New York City, United States
- Genre: Alternative rock; experimental rock
- Length: 38:07
- Label: Island
- Producer: Flood; John Parish; PJ Harvey

PJ Harvey and John Parish chronology
Dance Hall at Louse Point (1996)	A Woman a Man Walked By (2009)

PJ Harvey chronology
White Chalk (2007)	A Woman a Man Walked By (2009)	Let England Shake (2011)

Singles from A Woman a Man Walked By
- 1. "Black Hearted Love" Released: 13 April 2009

A Woman a Man Walked By is the second collaborative studio album by the English alternative rock musicians PJ Harvey and John Parish, released on 27 March 2009 by Island Records.

== Background ==
It is the second collaboration between Harvey and Parish, following 1996's Dance Hall at Louse Point. The album was recorded in Bristol and Dorset, and mixed by Flood. This album is made up of ten new songs. All the music is written by Parish, who also plays most of the instruments. The vocals and all lyrics are by Harvey. The first single from the album is "Black Hearted Love" which is described as having 'anthemic grunge-pop guitars.'

== Critical reception ==
Professional ratings
Review scores
Source	Rating
Allmusic	4/5 stars
Mojo	4/5 stars
musicOMH	4.5/5 stars
NME	(8/10)
Pitchfork Media	(6.2/10)
Q	4/5 stars
Rolling Stone	3.5/5 stars
Robert Christgau	(A−)
Slant Magazine	3.5/5 stars
The Observer	4/5 stars

At Metacritic, which assigns a normalised rating out of 100 to reviews from mainstream critics, the album received an average score of 75, based on 27 reviews, which indicates "Generally favorable reviews".

The album was described by journalist John Harris, as "...mischievous, deadly serious, elegant and poetic, and possessed of a brutal power – it is doubtful that you will hear a record as brimming with creative brio and musical invention this year..." In a track by track synopsis on their website, The Fly described the album as "a body of folk tales, funeral songs and trapped, tangled love songs... brilliant."

== Track listing ==
All songs written by PJ Harvey and John Parish.

1. "Black Hearted Love" – 4:40
2. "Sixteen, Fifteen, Fourteen" – 3:35
3. "Leaving California" – 3:56
4. "The Chair" – 2:29
5. "April" – 4:41
6. "A Woman a Man Walked By/The Crow Knows Where All the Little Children Go" – 4:47
7. "The Soldier" – 3:55
8. "Pig Will Not" – 3:50
9. "Passionless, Pointless" – 4:19
10. "Cracks in the Canvas" – 1:54

== Personnel ==
- Polly Jean Harvey – lyrics, vocals
- John Parish – guitars, drums, organ, ukulele, banjo

Additional musicians

- Eric Drew Feldman – bass guitar on "Black Hearted Love," keyboard on "April"
- Carla Azar – drums on "Black Hearted Love" and "April"
- Giovanni Ferrario – guitar on "Black Hearted Love," bass guitar on "April"
- Jean-Marc Butty – drums (live shows in support of A Woman a Man Walked By)

== Chart positions ==
Chart (2009)	Peak position
Australian ARIA Albums Chart	25
Austrian Ö3 Top 40	55
Belgian Albums Chart (Vl)	11
Belgian Albums Chart (Wa)	27
Danish Albums Chart	28
Dutch MegaCharts Top 100	46
French SNEP Albums Chart	13
German Albums Chart	62
Irish Albums Chart	39
Italian FIMI Albums Chart	45
Norwegian Albums Chart	13
Spanish Albums Chart	61
Swiss Hitparade Albums Chart	24
UK Albums Chart	25
US Billboard 200	80
