= The Hope Six Demolition Project =

Studio album by PJ Harvey
- Released: 15 April 2016
- Recorded: 16 January – 14 February 2015
- Studios: Somerset House, London
- Genre: Indie rock
- Length: 41:51
- Labels: Island; Vagrant
- Producers: Flood; John Parish; PJ Harvey

PJ Harvey chronology
Let England Shake (2011)	The Hope Six Demolition Project (2016)	I Inside the Old Year Dying (2023)

Singles from The Hope Six Demolition Project
- 1. "The Wheel" Released: 22 January 2016; 2. "The Community of Hope" Released: 11 March 2016; 3. "The Orange Monkey" Released: 7 April 2016

The Hope Six Demolition Project is the ninth studio album by the English singer-songwriter and musician PJ Harvey, released on 15 April 2016 on Island Records. It followed her acclaimed Mercury Prize-winning album Let England Shake, released in 2011.

The record's demo collection was released on March 11, 2022, to conclude Harvey's chronological re-release campaign of vinyl reissues and demo session offerings beginning in 2020.

At the 59th Annual Grammy Awards, the album was nominated for Best Alternative Music Album, her fourth nomination in that category and seventh nomination overall.

The album's title is a reference to the HOPE VI projects in the United States, "where run-down public housing in areas with high crime rates has been demolished to make room for better housing, but with the effect that many previous residents could no longer afford to live there, leading to claims of social cleansing". The HOPE VI program is directly referenced in the album's opening track and second single, "The Community of Hope". The title is inspired by Harvey's trip to Washington D.C. with photographer/filmmaker Seamus Murphy where she was given a tour by Paul Schwartzman of The Washington Post, who directly influenced some of the lyrics on the song. Upon its release, the song drew criticism directly from politicians running for the council seat in Ward 7 in Washington, D.C.

== Background and development ==
Harvey wrote the songs for The Hope Six Demolition Project as well as her poetry book The Hollow of the Hand during her travels to Kosovo, Afghanistan and Washington D.C. with photographer/filmmaker Seamus Murphy between 2011 and 2014.

== Recording ==
The album was created in sessions open to the public as part of an art installation at Somerset House in London called Recording in Progress. The sessions were forty-five minutes each in length and lasted for a month, beginning on 16 January 2015 and concluding on 14 February. Viewers could see Harvey create the album through one-way glass with producers Flood and John Parish, both of whom had worked on Harvey's previous album Let England Shake.

Mobile phones and devices with recording capabilities were confiscated before entering and viewers were led to a basement-level room. During the first viewing, she was working on a song called "Near the Memorials to Vietnam and Lincoln", which is featured on the album. Harvey was reportedly playing violin, harmonica and hurdy-gurdy. It was also reported that she was joined by musicians Terry Edwards and James Johnston and that Seamus Murphy was filming the entire session.

== Release ==
Both of the album's singles were premiered on BBC Radio 6 Music, each on the day before its release. "The Wheel" was premiered on Steve Lamacq's show on 21 January 2016. Lamacq also revealed the album's release date to be 15 April 2016. "The Community of Hope" was premiered on Shaun Keaveny's show on 10 March 2016. "The Orange Monkey" was released as the album's third single on 7 April 2016.

The music video for "The Wheel" was released on 1 February 2016, and that for "The Community of Hope" on 18 March 2016. Both videos were directed by Seamus Murphy.

== Critical reception ==
Professional ratings
Aggregate scores
Source	Rating
AnyDecentMusic?	7.4/10
Metacritic	79/100
Review scores
Source	Rating
AllMusic	3.5/5 stars
The A.V. Club	B
Chicago Tribune	4/4 stars
The Guardian	4/5 stars
The Independent	3/5 stars
NME	3/5
Pitchfork	7.6/10
Q	4/5 stars
Rolling Stone	3.5/5 stars
Spin	7/10

The Hope Six Demolition Project received generally positive reviews from critics. At Metacritic, which assigns a normalized rating out of 100 to reviews from mainstream publications, the album received an average score of 79, based on 34 reviews.

Greg Kot of the Chicago Tribune praised the album, writing that it "builds masterfully to a powerful, closing one-two punch". Vice journalist Robert Christgau was more reserved in his praise, briefly describing the record as "politics according to Polly, meaning keen observation, analytic detachment, and paradoxically forgiving melodies scarred again and again by baked-in pessimism and misanthropy". The album was named Mojo's ninth-best album of 2016 and Uncut's sixth-best album of 2016.

=== Other responses ===
Upon its release, the opening track and second single, "The Community of Hope", drew criticism directly from politicians running for the council seat in Ward 7 in Washington, D.C., with former DC Mayor Vincent C. Gray saying "I will not dignify this inane composition with a response", and his campaign treasurer Chuck Thies insulting Harvey with "PJ Harvey is to music what Piers Morgan is to cable news." Grant Thompson, a pastor and former Congressional staffer running for the Ward 7 council seat, stated that Harvey "needs to see more of the city".

At times, The Hope Six Demolition Project's lyrical content was criticized for being political without literally proposing government policy. Laura Snapes of Pitchfork asked, "By pointing out the problems in these three communities, but proposing no solutions, is she (Harvey) just as responsible for their desertion as the global powers that came before her?"

=== Accolades ===
Publication	Accolade	Year	Rank	Ref.
Mojo	The 50 Best Albums of 2016	2016	9	
Chicago Tribune	Top Albums of 2016	2016	6	
Q	The 50 Best Rock Albums of 2016	2016	3	
PopMatters	The 70 Best Albums of 2016	2016	53	
Under the Radar	Top 100 Albums of 2016	2016	54	
Uncut	Top 75 Best Albums of 2016	2016	6	
Diffuser	Top 40 Albums of 2016	2016	29	
FasterLouder	The 50 Best Albums of 2016	2016	45	

== Commercial performance ==
The album debuted at number one on the UK Albums Chart. It sold 11,436 copies and became PJ Harvey's first number-one album in the United Kingdom. In its second week, the album sold 3,372 copies and fell twenty-two places to number twenty-three. It registered the third-largest drop in chart history for a number one album; Christina Aguilera's Bionic (2010) had fallen twenty-eight places and The Vamps's Night & Day had fallen thirty-four places.

== Track listing ==
All tracks are written by PJ Harvey.

No.	Title	Length
1.	"The Community of Hope"	2:23
2.	"The Ministry of Defence"	4:11
3.	"A Line in the Sand"	3:33
4.	"Chain of Keys"	3:09
5.	"River Anacostia"	4:56
6.	"Near the Memorials to Vietnam and Lincoln"	2:59
7.	"The Orange Monkey"	2:47
8.	"Medicinals"	2:19
9.	"The Ministry of Social Affairs"	4:10
10.	"The Wheel"	5:38
11.	"Dollar, Dollar"	5:34
Total length:		41:51

Non-album tracks

No.	Title	Length
12.	"Guilty" (released 13 July 2016)	3:55
13.	"A Dog Called Money" (7" single, released 28 April 2017)	2:26
14.	"I'll Be Waiting" (7" single, released 28 April 2017)	3:27
15.	"The Camp" (collaboration with Ramy Essam, released 7 June 2017)	4:34
16.	"Dance on the Mountain"	4:01
17.	"Age of the Dollar" (released on B-Sides, Demos & Rarities in 2022)	3:14
18.	"Homo Sappy Blues" (released on B-Sides, Demos & Rarities in 2022)	2:22
Total length:		61:08

== Personnel ==
=== Musicians ===
- PJ Harvey – vocals (all tracks), guitar (2, 5, 6, 8–10), tenor saxophone (2 & 9), alto saxophone (7 & 8), violin (6), bass harmonica & auto harp (9), hand claps (10), piano & shaker (15)
- John Parish – backing vocals (all tracks), guitar (1, 3, 6, 7, 10, 14, 15), percussion (2–13), keyboards (2), variophon (3–5, 7, 9, 11), accordion (6), mellotron vibes (6, 11), baritone guitar & synth bass (8), autoharp (9), hand claps (10), piano & synthesizer (12), bass (12, 15), drums (15)
- Flood – production, backing vocals (1, 2, 4–6, 8–10, 12–14), synth bass (3), Sonic Maverick (9)
- Mick Harvey – backing vocals (2, 5, 7, 10), percussion (2, 7, 8, 10), Taurus pedals (2, 7, 9), slide guitar (3), keyboards (3, 7, 10, 11), bass (9), guitar & hand claps (10)
- Jean-Marc Butty – backing vocals (2, 5, 7), percussion (7, 8, 11)

Guest musicians

- Linton Kwesi Johnson – vocals (2)
- Terry Edwards – backing vocals (1, 4–6, 8, 9, 11, 13, 14), percussion (1, 4, 8, 13), baritone saxophone (1, 4), keyboards (5), guitar, flute & bass harmonica (6), saxophones (8, 9, 11), melodica (9), guitar (12)
- Mike Smith – backing vocals (1, 2, 4, 7, 10, 11, 14), baritone saxophone (1, 4, 7, 10), piano (1), keyboards (2, 4, 7), saxophones (2), percussion (7), hand claps (10)
- James Johnston – backing vocals (1, 3–6, 11–14), keyboards (1, 5), violin (4, 6), guitar (6, 8), organ (11, 13)
- Alain Johannes – backing vocals (1–4, 7, 10, 11, 14), guitar (1, 2, 7, 10), saxophone (2), keyboards (4), percussion (4, 7), hand claps (10)
- Kenrick Rowe – backing vocals (1, 4, 9, 10, 12, 14), percussion (1–4, 9, 10, 12), hand claps (10)
- Enrico Gabrielli – backing vocals (1, 4, 14), percussion (1), bass clarinet (1–4), swanee whistle (4), basset clarinet (12)
- Alessandro Stefana – backing vocals (1, 4, 12, 14), guitars (1–4, 12, 14)
- Adam 'Cecil' Bartlett – backing vocals (1, 4, 6, 10), bass (1, 4, 10)
- Ramy Essam – vocals & acoustic guitar (15)

=== Production ===
- Flood – producer, mixing
- John Parish – producer
- Drew Smith – mixing
- Rob Kirwan – recording, engineering
- Adam 'Cecil' Bartlett – additional engineering, mix engineering
- Caesar Edmunds – mix engineering

=== Design ===
- Michelle Henning – artwork, art direction
- Rob Crane – layout, design
- Seamus Murphy – photography

== Charts ==
=== Weekly charts ===
Chart (2016)	Peak position
Australian Albums (ARIA)	7
Austrian Albums (Ö3 Austria)	8
Belgian Albums (Ultratop Flanders)	3
Belgian Albums (Ultratop Wallonia)	8
Canadian Albums (Billboard)	38
Czech Albums (ČNS IFPI)	4
Danish Albums (Hitlisten)	14
Dutch Albums (Album Top 100)	4
Finnish Albums (Suomen virallinen lista)	16
French Albums (SNEP)	5
German Albums (Offizielle Top 100)	11
Greek Albums (IFPI)	5
Irish Albums (IRMA)	2
Italian Albums (FIMI)	17
New Zealand Albums (RMNZ)	7
Norwegian Albums (VG-lista)	2
Polish Albums (ZPAV)	13
Portuguese Albums (AFP)	6
Scottish Albums (Official Charts)	1
Swedish Albums (Sverigetopplistan)	8
Swiss Albums (Schweizer Hitparade)	4
UK Albums (Official Charts)	1
US Billboard 200	63

=== Year-end charts ===
Chart (2016)	Position
Belgian Albums (Ultratop Flanders)	85
Belgian Albums (Ultratop Wallonia)	158
