= The Community of Hope =

Single by PJ Harvey

from the album The Hope Six Demolition Project
- Released: 11 March 2016
- Studio: Somerset House (London, England)
- Genre: Alternative rock; folk rock
- Length: 2:23
- Label: Island; Vagrant
- Songwriter: PJ Harvey

PJ Harvey singles chronology
"The Wheel" (2016)	"The Community of Hope" (2016)	"The Orange Monkey" (2016)

Music video
- "The Community of Hope" on YouTube

"The Community of Hope" is a song by the English musician PJ Harvey. It is the opening track and second single from her ninth studio album, The Hope Six Demolition Project, and was released digitally on 11 March 2016 and physically on 16 April 2016 on Island Records.

The song was premiered on Shaun Keaveny's show on BBC Radio 6 Music on 10 March 2016, the day before its release.

== Inspiration ==
The song developed from PJ Harvey's poem "Sight-Seeing, South of the River", published in her 2015 poetry book The Hollow of the Hand. In the "Acknowledgements" section of the book she thanks The Washington Post reporter Paul Schwartzman for this poem. Paul Schwartzman described his experience in article "I gave a famous rock star a windshield tour of D.C. — and didn't know who she was". Some of the lines in the song are direct transcriptions of Schwartzman's comments; video sections of his tour are featured in the music video.

The song's repeating line "they're gonna put a Walmart here" refers to a notorious initiative in which Wal-Mart was permitted for the first time to open outlets in the city proper in exchange for constructing some in particularly deprived parts of the city, which it was hoped would reduce a food desert problem. Walmart only opened stores in affluent parts of the city before cancelling plans to open any in poorer areas.

The locations in the poem are listed in no clear order, but trace a clean linear path beginning at the Skyland Mall on Alabama Avenue, the planned location for the Southeast Walmart, following Alabama Avenue past the only IHOP in Southeast DC at Alabama and 15th. Alabama merges with Martin Luther King boulevard just past the Ward 7/8 border, by St Elizabeth's Hospital (the former institution referenced in the song), then continues past the junction of MLK and South Capitol Street and one block south past the Community of Hope, a community clinic which provides medical and social services to under-served populations in DC, which is referenced in the poem by the statement "Here's the Community of Hope".

== Criticism ==
Upon its release, "The Community of Hope" drew criticism from people unaware that some of her lyrics were direct quotes from Schwartzman and intended to portray popular attitudes about the city. It was commented upon by politicians running for the council seat in Ward 7 in the District of Columbia, with former DC Mayor Vincent C. Gray saying, "I will not dignify this inane composition with a response," and his campaign treasurer Chuck Thies insulting Harvey with, "PJ Harvey is to music what Piers Morgan is to cable news."

Grant Thompson, a pastor and former Congressional staffer running for the Ward 7 council seat, stated that Harvey "needs to see more of the city."

The circumstances under which music video was produced were also criticized by Joshua Alston, writing for The A.V. Club. Much of his criticism focused on both the use of a black gospel choir "to evoke earthiness, spirituality, and rapturous emotion" as cultural appropriation, as well as Harvey's failure to "treat the natives of that community [she is writing about] with dignity and respect," citing her refusal to be interviewed by a member of the community who guided her on a tour of the city.

== Track listing ==
All tracks are written by PJ Harvey.

No.	Title	Length
1.	"The Community of Hope"	2:23

== Charts ==
Chart (2016)	Peak position
Spanish Physical Singles (PROMUSICAE)	6

== Personnel ==
Credits adapted from liner notes of The Hope Six Demolition Project.

- PJ Harvey - vocals
- John Parish - guitar, background vocals
- Terry Edwards - baritone saxophone, percussion, background vocals
- Kenrick Rowe - percussion, background vocals
- Enrico Gabrielli - bass clarinet, percussion, background vocals
- Mike Smith - piano, baritone saxophone, background vocals
- Alessandro Stefana - guitar, background vocals
- James Johnston - keyboards, background vocals
- Alain Johannes - guitar, background vocals
- Adam 'Cecil' Bartlett - bass, background vocals
- Flood - background vocals
