= Let England Shake =

Studio album by PJ Harvey
- Released: 14 February 2011
- Recorded: April–May 2010
- Studio: Eype Church in Dorset, United Kingdom
- Genre: Folk rock
- Length: 40:15
- Label: Island; Vagrant
- Producer: Flood; Mick Harvey; John Parish; PJ Harvey

PJ Harvey chronology
A Woman a Man Walked By (2009)	Let England Shake (2011)	The Hope Six Demolition Project (2016)

Singles from Let England Shake
- 1. "The Words That Maketh Murder" Released: 7 February 2011; 2. "The Glorious Land" Released: 18 April 2011; 3. "Written on the Forehead" Released: 2011

Let England Shake is the eighth studio album by the English singer-songwriter and musician PJ Harvey, released on 14 February 2011 by Island Records. Production began around the time of White Chalk's release in 2007, though it is a departure from the piano-driven introspection of that album. Let England Shake was written over a 2 1/2-year period, and recorded in five weeks at a church in Dorset during April and May 2010.

Upon release, the album received numerous accolades. It was placed 2011 "Album of the Year" by 16 publications and in September 2011 won the coveted Mercury Prize. It was PJ Harvey's fourth nomination overall (including 2001's winner Stories from the City, Stories from the Sea), making her the most successful artist in the prize's history. The album also won the Uncut Music Award in November 2011, as well as Album of the Year in the 2012 Ivor Novello Awards.

== Background and development ==
Harvey began writing lyrics for the album before setting the words to music. She has cited the poetry of Harold Pinter and T.S. Eliot as influences, as well as the artwork of Salvador Dalí and Francisco de Goya, the music of The Doors, The Pogues, and The Velvet Underground and the films of Stanley Kubrick, Ken Loach and Ari Folman. She has also spoken of researching the history of conflict, including the Gallipoli Campaign, and reading modern-day testimonies from civilians and soldiers in Iraq and Afghanistan.

During some solo shows some years prior to working on this album, Harvey had begun playing the autoharp. She told local newspaper Bridport News in 2011: "I was really enjoying this different, enormous, wide breadth of sound that the autoharp gives. It's quite a delicate sound, but it's also like having an entire orchestra at your fingertips. I began by writing quite a lot on the autoharp, and then slowly as time went by, (because this album was written over two and a half years)… my writing started moving into experimenting with different guitars, and using different sound applications, ones that I had never really experimented with."

On the subject of a new vocal style for the album, Harvey commented that "I couldn't sing [the songs] in a rich strong mature voice without it sounding completely wrong. So I had to slowly find the voice, and this voice started to develop, almost taking on the role of a narrator."

== Recording ==
Harvey told Spinner in March 2009 that she had recorded demos for the album and planned to record in early 2010, commenting: "All I can say is that I am pleased with it, because I feel it's a grand departure from anything [I've done] before. If I've done that, then for me, it's worked. I'm already feeling like I did, and I'm happy. I'm very pleased because I'm not repeating myself."

After initially searching for recording studios in Berlin in mid-2009 while touring A Woman a Man Walked By with John Parish, Harvey instead opted to record at St. Peter's Church, Eype, near Bridport in Dorset. She told Bridport News: "I remembered that the man who now runs this church as an arts venue had said to me a few times if I'd ever wanted to use it for a show or rehearsals that he'd love that, and that's when I approached him and asked if we could use it."

The album was recorded in the church in a five-week period in April and May 2010 with long-time collaborators John Parish and Mick Harvey, and with both co-producing along with Flood; drummer Jean-Marc Butty added parts at a later stage. Much of the record was recorded live, and Harvey has described the recording as reasonably improvisational, commenting: "I wanted to leave room for them so they could bring their feelings into it as well. Usually I would have planned everything and known what instrumentation I wanted. This time I demoed the songs mostly with one or two instruments with a voice and that was as much as I had. So I basically had the chords and a couple of saxophone melodies, a couple of voice melodies and that was what I took with me to the church. We rehearsed the songs as if we were rehearsing to play them live and found quite quickly that we had only rehearsed a song through maybe twice and Flood had started recording us." The sessions were recorded by engineer Rob Kirwan.

The album features Harvey's first on-record use of the saxophone.

== Release ==
Preceding the album release, the first single, "The Words That Maketh Murder", was released by Island Records on 17 January 2011 digitally and 7 February 2011 on vinyl (together with the non-album track "The Guns Called Me Back Again" from the album recording session). The album followed on 14 February 2011 (Europe, rest of the world) and on 15 February (Canada, US). As Island Records released the album in Europe, Canada and rest of the world, it was released by Vagrant Records in US. It is available as Digital Download on several platforms, CD and LP.

In December 2021, Harvey announced a vinyl reissue of the album for January 28, 2022, alongside a companion disc of demos for the album.

== Films ==
After seeing Seamus Murphy's "A Darkness Visible" exhibition in London in 2008, Harvey contacted Murphy as she "wanted to speak to him more about his experiences being there in Afghanistan". The collaboration grew, with Murphy taking promotional photographs in July 2010 before filming accompanying videos for each song on the album which were completed in January 2011. On 14–17 July 2011 the 12 films (as whole or individually) are screened for the first time at several UK festivals.

On 12 December 2011, Murphy's short films were released on DVD as Let England Shake: 12 Short Films by Seamus Murphy.

== Tour and live performances ==
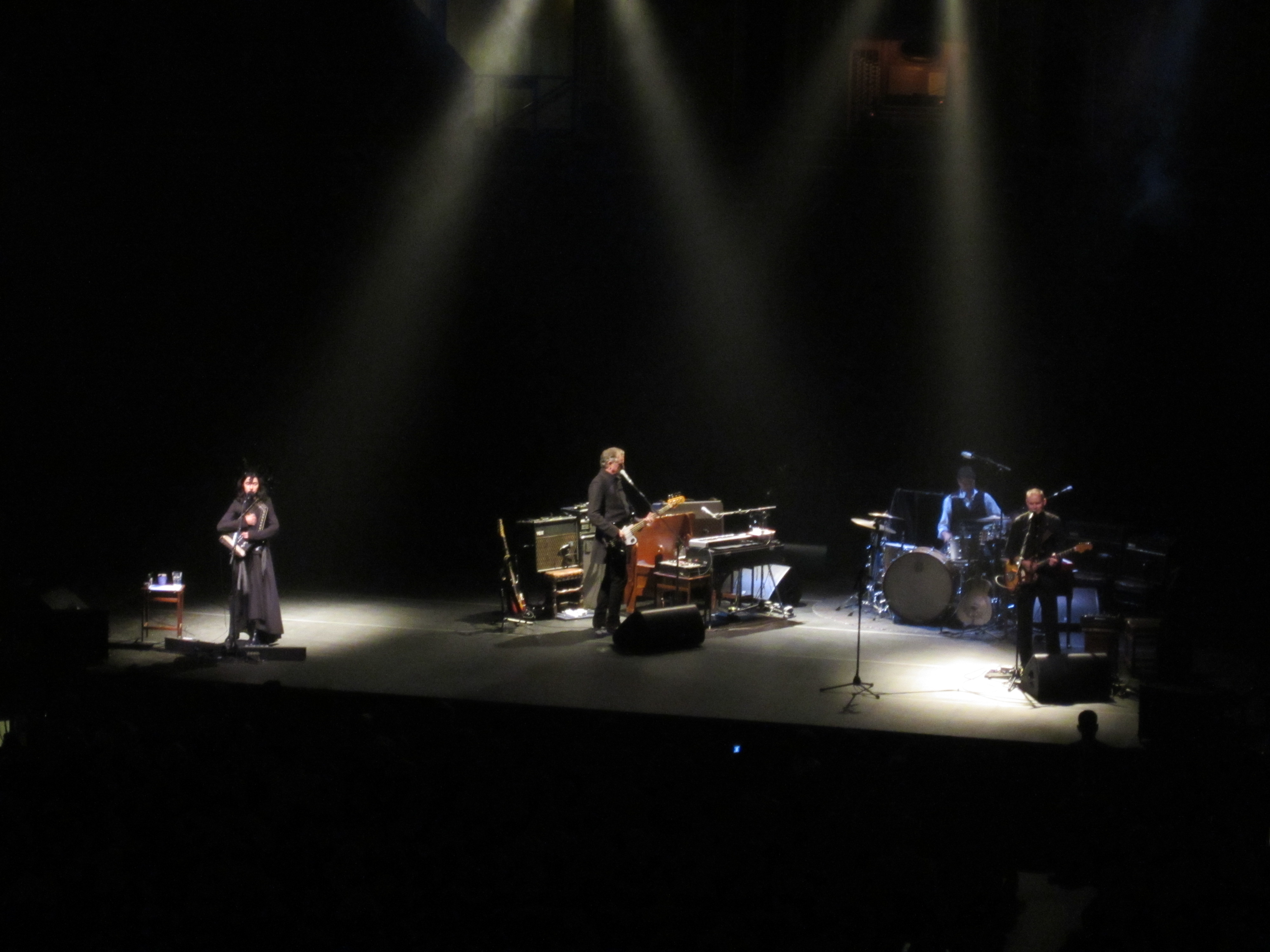
PJ Harvey and her band playing at the Royal Albert Hall in London on 31 October 2011

Two of the album's tracks made their debut at the Bestival music festival in July 2009, in Harvey's only live performance of the year. In April 2010, around the time of the album recording, Harvey appeared on BBC One's The Andrew Marr Show for an interview and performance of "Let England Shake", in front of then-Prime Minister Gordon Brown.

Harvey previewed the album with a show at the St. Peter's Church, Eype, Dorset (where the album was recorded) on 18 December 2010, performing songs from the new album as well as songs from her back catalogue.

A European tour took place in February 2011, with a US leg in April, and festivals scheduled in the summer. A live performance in "La Maroquinerie" in Paris on 14 February 2011 was streamed as live webcast by Deezer and also by Arte. On 12 July 2011 Arte broadcast on television a 73 min recording of a February 2011 live performance in Paris Olympia. Selected live performance dates to promote the album (not complete):

== Critical reception ==
Professional ratings
Aggregate scores
Source	Rating
AnyDecentMusic?	8.7/10
Metacritic	86/100
Review scores
Source	Rating
AllMusic	5/5 stars
The Daily Telegraph	5/5 stars
Entertainment Weekly	A
The Guardian	5/5 stars
Los Angeles Times	4/4 stars
MSN Music (Expert Witness)	B+
NME	10/10
Pitchfork	8.8/10
Rolling Stone	3/5 stars
Spin	9/10

Let England Shake received widespread critical acclaim upon its release. At Metacritic, which assigns a normalised rating out of 100 to reviews from mainstream critics, the album received an average score of 86, based on 42 reviews, indicating "universal acclaim". AllMusic reviewer Heather Phares referred to the album as "a set of songs strikingly different from what came before" and added that "its complexities make it one of Harvey's most cleverly crafted works." Praising it as Harvey's "most affecting and impressive work so far", Mike Williams of NME wrote: "Francis Ford Coppola can lay claim to the war movie. Ernest Hemingway the war novel. Polly Jean Harvey, a 41-year-old from Dorset, has claimed the war album." Peter Paphides of Mojo called Let England Shake an "uncannily timely piece of work," with Harvey at "her most powerful." Q's Victoria Segal praised the album's "remarkable lyrics" and "ethereal music," awarding the album a full five-star review, and Uncut reviewer Andrew Mueller designated Let England Shake as the magazine's Album of the Month, calling it "the sound of someone as maddened as they are enthralled, aglow with anger and passion."

Alexis Petridis of The Guardian described Let England Shake as "a richly inventive album that's unlike anything else in Harvey's back catalogue" and referred to Harvey as being "at her creative peak." In The Daily Telegraph, Neil McCormick called it an "extraordinary album" and "a profound and serious work from a singer-songwriter at the height of her powers, a meditation on mankind's apparently endless appetite for self-destruction" and in The Independent, Andy Gill stated that it "may be her best album," described it as "a portrait of her homeland as a country built on bloodshed and battle". Amanda Petrusich, in her review for Spin, praised the album's "bloody and forceful" sound, and Jesse Cataldo of Slant Magazine said that Let England Shake creates a "matchless musical world where Harvey reigns with autonomy". Pitchfork editor Scott Plagenhoef noted that "it's universal and it's necessary – and it's powerfully and clearly stated", giving the album a "Best New Music" designation. Robert Christgau, writing in MSN Music, called the album "a suite of well-turned if unnecessarily understated antiwar songs" and compared Harvey's "evolution" to that of Annie Haslam. Rolling Stone gave the album a mixed review and a three-star rating. Stuart Maconie wrote in Radio Times that "all her records have been interesting and singular, but for me none had the sheer, visceral, otherly power" of Let England Shake.

The album was also included in the book 1001 Albums You Must Hear Before You Die.

=== Accolades ===
Publication	Accolade	Rank	Ref.
NME	50 Best Albums of 2011	1	
Q	Top 50 Albums of 2011	2	
The Quietus	Albums Of The Year 2011	1	
musicOMH	Top 50 Albums of 2011	1	
Mojo	Top 50 Albums of 2011	1	
guardian.co.uk	The Best 50 Albums of 2011	1	
Drowned in Sound	Favourite Albums of 2011	3	
Pitchfork	The Top 50 Albums of 2011	4	
Pitchfork	The 200 Best Albums of the 2010s	144	
The Wire	Top 50 Releases of the Year	21	
NME	Top 100 Albums of the Decade	4	

== Commercial performance ==
Let England Shake entered the UK Albums Chart at number 8 with first-week sales of 22,468. These sales were an improvement on the estimated 14,000 copies of her previous album White Chalk's first-week sales. Let England Shake was also Harvey's second album to reach the Top 10, and the first in eighteen years, since Rid of Me peaked at number 3 in May 1993. The album also entered the Billboard 200 in the United States at number 32 with sales of around 18,000 copies.

Following its win of the Mercury Prize in September 2011, Let England Shake re-entered the UK Albums Chart at number 24. Sales of the album increased by 1,100% following the awards ceremony and it was subsequently certified Gold in the United Kingdom for shipment of over 100,000 units. The album was also later certified Gold in Denmark after sales of more than 10,000 copies. The album had sold approximately 130,000 copies in the United Kingdom as of December 2011, and 86,000 copies in the United States as of March 2016. As of September 2017 it had sold 173,000 copies in United Kingdom.

== Track listing ==
All tracks are written by PJ Harvey.

No.	Title	Length
1.	"Let England Shake"	3:09
2.	"The Last Living Rose"	2:21
3.	"The Glorious Land"	3:34
4.	"The Words That Maketh Murder"	3:45
5.	"All and Everyone"	5:39
6.	"On Battleship Hill"	4:07
7.	"England"	3:11
8.	"In the Dark Places"	2:59
9.	"Bitter Branches"	2:29
10.	"Hanging in the Wire"	2:42
11.	"Written on the Forehead"	3:39
12.	"The Colour of the Earth"	2:33
Total length:		40:15

iTunes pre-order bonus track

No.	Title	Length
13.	"The Guns Called Me Back Again"	2:45

iTunes bonus material

No.	Title	Length
13.	"The Nightingale"	4:13
14.	"The Last Living Rose" (video)	2:50
15.	"The Words That Maketh Murder" (video)	4:25

- "Written in the Forehead" includes a sample of 'Blood & Fire'. Written by Winston Holness and performed as Niney the Observer.

== Personnel ==
Musicians

- PJ Harvey – vocals, guitar (2, 3, 5, 7, 8, 11, 12), autoharp (1, 4, 5, 12), saxophone (1, 2, 4, 5, 8), zither (6), violin (7)
- John Parish – guitar (2–4, 6, 9, 10, 12), drums (1, 2, 5, 7–9, 12), percussion (3, 4, 6, 11), trombone (1, 2, 4, 5, 8), rhodes (1, 8, 11), mellotron (1, 7, 12), xylophone (1), backing vocals (2–6, 8, 9, 11, 12)
- Mick Harvey – vocals (12), guitar (8, 9, 11), bass (4), drums (2, 4, 11), percussion (4, 6, 11), bass harmonica (1, 4, 5, 8, 9), piano (1, 6, 10), organ (2, 5, 7, 8), rhodes (3, 6), xylophone (9), backing vocals (2–6, 8–12)
- Jean-Marc Butty – drums (3, 6, 8, 10, 12), backing vocals (3, 5, 6, 8)

Guest musicians

- Sammy Hurden – backing vocals (8, 12)
- Greta Berlin – backing vocals (8, 12)
- Lucy Roberts – backing vocals (8, 12)

Technical

- Flood – producer, mixing
- Rob Kirwan – engineer, recording
- Stefano de Silva – mastering
- Catherine Marks – mixing assistant
- John Catlin – mixing assistant
- John Parish – additional producer
- Mick Harvey – additional producer
- PJ Harvey – additional producer

Design

- Rob Crane – layout, design
- PJ Harvey – layout, design, drawings
- Michelle Henning – cover design
- Seamus Murphy – photography
- Cat Stevens – photography

== Charts positions ==
Chart (2011)	Peak position
Australian ARIA Albums Chart	6
Austrian Ö3 Albums Chart	15
Belgian Albums Chart (Flanders)	4
Belgian Alternative Albums Chart (Flanders)	3
Belgian Mid-Price Albums Chart (Flanders)	6
Belgian Albums Chart (Wallonia)	8
Canadian Albums Chart	23
Danish Albums Chart	3
Dutch Albums Chart	14
Finnish Albums Chart	7
French SNEP Albums Chart	6
German Albums Chart	20
Irish Albums Chart	7
Italian FIMI Albums Chart	57
Japanese Oricon Albums Chart	151
New Zealand RIANZ Albums Chart	12
Norwegian Albums Chart	2
Polish OLiS Albums Chart	30
Portuguese AFP Albums Chart	8
Spanish Albums Chart	20
Swedish Albums Chart	6
Swiss Hitparade Albums Chart	4
UK Albums Chart	8
US Billboard 200	32
US Billboard Alternative Albums	6
US Billboard Independent Albums	7
US Billboard Rock Albums	6

=== Singles ===
Year	Single	Peak positions
Year	Single	BEL
2011	"The Last Living Rose" (Note: "The Last Living Rose" was not a retail single release. It was issued as an official promotional single throughout Europe following Let England Shake's release.)	39

=== Year-end charts ===
Chart (2011)	Position
UK Albums (OCC)	89
Belgian Albums Chart (Flanders)	82
French Albums (SNEP)	136
Danish Albums Chart	63
Swedish Albums Chart	83

== Certifications and sales ==
Region	Certification	Certified units/sales
Denmark (IFPI Danmark)	Gold	10,000^{^}
United Kingdom (BPI)	Gold	173,000
United States	—	86,000
^{^} Shipments figures based on certification alone.
