= I Inside the Old Year Dying =

Studio album by PJ Harvey
- Released: 7 July 2023
- Recorded: January–February 2022
- Studio: Battery Studios, London
- Genre: Post-punk; neofolk; folk rock
- Length: 39:32
- Label: Partisan
- Producer: Flood; John Parish; Rob Kirwan

PJ Harvey chronology
The Hope Six Demolition Project (2016)	I Inside the Old Year Dying (2023)

Singles from I Inside the Old Year Dying
- 1. "A Child's Question, August" Released: 26 April 2023; 2. "I Inside the Old I Dying" Released: 7 June 2023; 3. "Seem an I" Released: 26 February 2024

I Inside the Old Year Dying is the tenth studio album by the English singer-songwriter and musician PJ Harvey, released on 7 July 2023 through Partisan Records. It is her first album of new material since The Hope Six Demolition Project (2016).

This is Harvey's first album on an independent label since Dry on Too Pure in 1992; Harvey had been signed with Island Records (Universal Music Group) for 30 years. The album was produced by Flood and John Parish, with additional production done by Rob Kirwan. The lead single, "A Child's Question, August", was released on 26 April 2023. Upon release, the album was met with widespread critical acclaim, and debuted at number 5 on the UK Albums Chart.

The album was nominated for the Best Alternative Music Album at the 66th Annual Grammy Awards, losing to The Record by boygenius.

== Background ==
Harvey began sharing photographs of herself in the studio recording the album in February 2022. In an April 2022 interview with The Observer, she confirmed that a new album would be released in 2023. In June 2022, she announced that she had finished the album and intended to release it in mid-2023. Throughout 2023, she teased the impending release of new music.

In a statement with the album's announcement on 25 April 2023, Harvey said the album took "many years of work" and "was a difficult album to make" as it "took time to find its strongest form, but it has finally become all [she] hoped for it to be". It was inspired by her epic poem "Orlam", and was partially improvised with producers Flood and John Parish, with Harvey describing the meaning as "searching, looking—the intensity of first love, and seeking meaning". She additionally called it "a resting space, a solace, a comfort, a balm—which feels timely for the times we're in". Along with Harvey recording the album alongside Flood and Parish, the album is said to be "scattered with Biblical imagery and references to Shakespeare and Elvis Presley".

British actors Colin Morgan and Ben Whishaw inspired both the book Orlam and the album. Their voices can be heard on several tracks. John Parish has also contributed his vocals.

== Promotion ==
On 6 June 2023, Harvey announced a UK and European tour in support of the album, with 26 dates starting on 22 September in Dublin. Two concerts were held in each city, and ended with the last show on 31 October in Oslo.

Harvey also released an additional music video for "Lwonesome Tonight", made from the photo visuals by Steve Gullick shot during the recording process of the album.

Harvey performed at 17 music festivals in Europe during the summer of 2024 and toured the United States in support of the album throughout September and October 2024, as well as touring Australia and Japan in March 2025.

== Critical reception ==
Professional ratings
Aggregate scores
Source	Rating
AnyDecentMusic?	8.2/10
Metacritic	85/100
Review scores
Source	Rating
AllMusic	4.5/5 stars
Clash	8/10
The Guardian	4/5 stars
The Independent	4/5 stars
Mojo	4/5 stars
NME	4/5 stars
Pitchfork	7.9/10
The Skinny	5/5 stars
Slant Magazine	3.5/5 stars
Uncut	4.5/5 stars

I Inside the Old Year Dying received a score of 85 out of 100 on review aggregator Metacritic based on 24 critics' reviews, indicating "universal acclaim". Aggregator AnyDecentMusic? gave it 8.2 out of 10, based on their assessment of the critical consensus.

The Guardian's Alexis Petridis named it his album of the week, describing it as "enigmatic and occasionally disturbing" as well as "a rough-edged LP full of potency and atmosphere", and concluding that "like the Dorset woods they describe, I Inside the Old Year Dying is eerily forbidding, but intoxicating, and easy to lose yourself in". Mojo's Victoria Segal remarked that the album "holds itself at the biting point between old and new" and called it "a record [Harvey] was born to make", while Uncut's Alistair MacKay noted it as "a singular thing".

NME's Elizabeth Aubrey described the album as "elusive and mesmerising", and while "it takes a little time to immerse yourself in Harvey's world, [...] once there, you won't want to leave". Tony Inglis of The Skinny called it Harvey's "most beguiling work yet" and felt she, Parish and Flood meld "indelible melodies and structures with a writerly form that intertwines modernism with ancient unknowns". Sam Walker-Smart of Clash felt similarly, writing that Harvey "meshes the intimate and experimental to create something thrillingly unique. Pastoral and poetic, naturally, but with moments of unease and explosive outbursts".

Reviewing the album for AllMusic, Heather Phares claimed it "a triumph in its own right" and declared, "I Inside the Old Year Dying's lively exploration is also a rekindling of something vital in Harvey's art in general. Though its whispers and shadows may not reveal everything, they're more than enough for a fascinating listening experience." Charles Lyons-Burt provided a more reserved assessment for Slant Magazine; "this is an album that gives about as much as it asks in return, even if its medieval trappings and intentional obfuscation do risk letting listeners walk away feeling more bewildered than moved." The Wire found there to be "a consistent low level sense of discomfort, or of familiar sounds or words taking on bizarro parallel forms" along with "sounds that can't easily be identified, or that sit in between recognisable timbres".

Evan Rytlewski of Pitchfork described the album as a "hallucinatory dreamworld [made] out of folk instruments, primitive electronics, and warped field recordings", also writing that its "sinewy strangeness may come at the expense of the immediacy that was once Harvey's strong suit, but this is how PJ Harvey albums work now: You feel them without being able to explain them". Helen Brown of The Independent stated that Harvey's "fans will be all in for this mucky pagan whirl" and felt that the closing track, "A Noiseless Noise", would be "a terrific set closer live".

=== Year-end lists ===
Select year-end rankings of I Inside the Old Year Dying
Publication	List	Rank	Ref.
Consequence	The 50 Best Albums of 2023	50	
The Line of Best Fit	The Best Albums of 2023	25	
Paste	The 50 Best Albums of 2023	44	

== Track listing ==
I Inside the Old Year Dying track listing
No.	Title	Length
1.	"Prayer at the Gate"	4:14
2.	"Autumn Term"	3:20
3.	"Lwonesome Tonight"	3:48
4.	"Seem an I"	3:06
5.	"The Nether-edge"	3:17
6.	"I Inside the Old Year Dying"	1:52
7.	"All Souls"	4:21
8.	"A Child's Question, August"	2:46
9.	"I Inside the Old I Dying"	3:08
10.	"August"	2:41
11.	"A Child's Question, July"	3:02
12.	"A Noiseless Noise"	3:57
Total length:		39:32

== Personnel ==
Musicians

- PJ Harvey – vocals, nylon string guitar, steel string guitar, electric guitar, baritone guitar, bass guitar, piano, Rhodes piano, bass clarinet, drawings, inner sleeve photography
- John Parish – drums, percussion, vocals, Rhodes piano, synth, variophon, trombone, acoustic and electric guitar, bass guitar, mixing, production
- Cecil – field recording samples, voice samples, bass keyboards, keyboards, synth, piano, loop creations, additional recording
- Flood – synth, field recording samples, effects, pedals, loop creations, sonic disturbance, mixing, production
- Ben Whishaw – backing vocals (tracks 8 & 10)
- Colin Morgan – backing vocals (tracks 9 & 11)

Production

- Rob Kirwan – mixing, additional production, recording
- Ed Farrell – assistant engineer
- Jacob Zinzan – 2nd assistant engineer
- Sumit Bothra – executive producer, management
- Oliver Baldwin – additional recording
- Jasdaface – lacquer cut by
- Sam Petts-Davies – Original Recordings Of Ben Whishaw and Colin Morgan
- ATC Management, Brian Message, Olivia Plunket – management
- Jason Mitchell – mastering at Loud Mastering
- Michelle Henning – art direction, design, front cover photography
- Todd Lynn – back cover portrait - dress by
- Kieran Tudor – back cover portrait - hair by
- Rob Crane – additional design and typesetting
- Steve Gullick – portrait & studio photograph
- Brian Whar – portrait & studio photography assisted by

== Charts ==
Chart performance for I Inside the Old Year Dying
Chart (2023)	Peak position
Australian Albums (ARIA)	44
Austrian Albums (Ö3 Austria)	6
Belgian Albums (Ultratop Flanders)	3
Belgian Albums (Ultratop Wallonia)	3
Dutch Albums (Album Top 100)	5
Finnish Albums (Suomen virallinen lista)	40
French Albums (SNEP)	8
German Albums (Offizielle Top 100)	7
Irish Albums (IRMA)	20
New Zealand Albums (RMNZ)	13
Polish Albums (ZPAV)	61
Scottish Albums (OCC)	3
Spanish Albums (PROMUSICAE)	34
Swiss Albums (Schweizer Hitparade)	4
UK Albums (OCC)	5
UK Independent Albums (OCC)	1

This is also the first studio album since Dry (1992), which did not chart on the US Billboard 200 album chart.
