= The Wheel (song) =

Single by PJ Harvey

Single by PJ Harvey

from the album The Hope Six Demolition Project
- Released: 22 January 2016
- Studio: Somerset House (London, England)
- Genre: Garage punk
- Length: 5:37
- Label: Island; Vagrant
- Songwriter(s): PJ Harvey

PJ Harvey singles chronology
| "The Glorious Land" (2011) | "The Wheel" (2016) | "The Community of Hope" (2016) |

Music video
- "The Wheel" on YouTube

"The Wheel" is a song by the English musician PJ Harvey. It is the tenth track and lead single from her ninth studio album, The Hope Six Demolition Project, and was released digitally on 22 January 2016 and physically on 4 March 2016 on Island Records.

The song was premiered on Steve Lamacq's show on BBC Radio 6 Music on 21 January 2016, the day before its release. Pitchfork would later list "The Wheel" on their ranking of the 100 best songs of 2016 at number 80.

== Background of the song and making of the music video ==
The music video for "The Wheel" was released on 1 February 2016 and was directed by Séamus Murphy. In a statement to Noisey, Harvey said:

When I’m writing a song I visualize the entire scene. I can see the colors, I can tell the time of day, I can sense the mood, I can see the light changing, the shadows moving, everything in that picture. Gathering information from secondary sources felt too far removed for what I was trying to write about. I wanted to smell the air, feel the soil and meet the people of the countries I was fascinated with.

In his statement to Noisey, Murphy, a famous conflict zone photographer, described the inspiration for the song, video, and the project as a whole:

The song 'The Wheel' has the journey to Kosovo at its center. Who is to say what else has influenced and informed its creation? The sight of a revolving fairground wheel in Fushë Kosovë/Kosovo Polje near the capital Pristina is the concrete reference point for the title. Was that sight alone the inspiration for the song? Without being told the stories of people who had suffered during the war, without visiting villages abandoned through ethnic cleansing and cycles of vengeance, without experiencing the different perceptions of people with shared histories, could the song have been written?

== Track listing ==
All tracks are written by PJ Harvey.

| No. | Title | Length |
|---|---|---|
| 1. | "The Wheel" | 5:37 |
