= White Chalk =

Studio album by PJ Harvey
- Released: 24 September 2007
- Recorded: November 2006 – March 2007
- Genre: Chamber folk
- Length: 33:57
- Label: Island
- Producer: Flood; John Parish; PJ Harvey

PJ Harvey chronology
The Peel Sessions 1991–2004 (2006)	White Chalk (2007)	A Woman a Man Walked By (2009)

Singles from White Chalk
- 1. "When Under Ether" Released: 17 September 2007; 2. "The Piano" Released: 3 December 2007; 3. "The Devil" Released: 18 March 2008

White Chalk is the seventh studio album by the English singer-songwriter and musician PJ Harvey, released on 24 September 2007 on Island Records.

Work on the album started in 2006, with producer Flood and John Parish, who also worked on her To Bring You My Love and Is This Desire? albums. Other collaborators on White Chalk are Eric Drew Feldman and Jim White from Dirty Three.

The first single released from White Chalk was "When Under Ether" on 17 September 2007 on digital download and 7" vinyl. A second single, "The Piano," was released on 26 November 2007. A third, "The Devil," was released on 7", download, and CD formats in March 2008.

== Style ==
The previous album, Uh Huh Her, had a raw sound but for this record White Chalk, Rolling Stone's magazine noted that Harvey "delved further into a Goth-like vibe in the much quieter, haunting, piano-based music". For this album she gave up the traditional three-piece guitar/bass/drums sound and recorded a set of songs for piano, despite her lack of expertise on the instrument. In an interview in The Wire she explained, "the great thing about learning a new instrument from scratch is that it [...] liberates your imagination."

Vocally, she sang in a much higher register than usual, at a pitch outside her normal range, and "howled about being possessed by demon lovers and ghosts". Lyrically, Harvey continued with the dark, moody themes typical of much of her music.

Harvey elaborated the meaning behind the album's title: "I just like the sound of the words white chalk. It can be millions of years old but erased in a second, and somehow has a timeless quality... The timelessness became more the source of inspiration".

== Critical reception ==
Professional ratings
Aggregate scores
Source	Rating
Metacritic	80/100
Review scores
Source	Rating
AllMusic	4/5 stars
The A.V. Club	A−
Entertainment Weekly	C
The Guardian	4/5 stars
Mojo	4/5 stars
NME	7/10
Pitchfork	6.8/10
Q	4/5 stars
Rolling Stone	4/5 stars
Spin	3.5/5 stars

White Chalk received critical acclaim and has a score of 80 out of 100 on Metacritic. Uncut hailed the album in glowing terms, calling it "an album of lonely beauty and piercing sorrow" before concluding, "White Chalk is P.J. Harvey back at the peak of her considerable powers." The Observer gave the album 5 stars out of 5, while Robert Christgau picked out one song from the album, "When Under Ether", as a "choice cut".

In December 2007, American webzine Somewhere Cold voted White Chalk CD of the Year on their 2007 Somewhere Cold Awards Hall of Fame.

=== Accolades ===
Publication	Accolade	Year	Rank	Ref.
NME	2007 Albums of the Year	2007	13	
Stylus Magazine	Top 50 Albums of 2007	2007	50	
PopMatters	The Best Albums of 2007	2007	47	
The Wire	50 Records of the Year	2007	45	

== Formats ==
The US release is available on CD and 33 1/3 rpm LP. The UK release is available on CD and 45 rpm vinyl record. White Chalk is also available on iTunes complete with a bonus track, "Wait".

== Track listing ==
All tracks are written by PJ Harvey.

No.	Title	Length
1.	"The Devil"	2:55
2.	"Dear Darkness"	3:09
3.	"Grow Grow Grow"	3:21
4.	"When Under Ether"	2:22
5.	"White Chalk"	3:06
6.	"Broken Harp"	1:57
7.	"Silence"	3:05
8.	"To Talk to You"	4:00
9.	"The Piano"	2:36
10.	"Before Departure"	3:45
11.	"The Mountain"	3:10
Total length:		33:57

iTunes bonus track
No.	Title	Length
12.	"Wait"	2:17
Total length:		36:14

== Personnel ==
All personnel credits adapted from the album's liner notes.

Musicians

- PJ Harvey – vocals, piano, acoustic guitar, bass, keyboards, zither, harmonica, harp, cigfiddle
- John Parish – drums, bass guitar, acoustic guitar, banjo, percussion, backing vocals
- Eric Drew Feldman – piano, keyboards, optigan, mellotron, minimoog, backing vocals
- Jim White – drums, percussion

Additional musicians

- Nico Brown – concertina, backing vocals (on "Before Departure")
- Andrew Dickson – backing vocals (on "Before Departure")
- Bridget Pearse – backing vocals (on "Before Departure")
- Martin Brunsden – backing vocals (on "Before Departure")
- Nick Bicât – backing vocals (on "Before Departure")

Technical

- Flood – producer, engineer, mixing
- John Parish – producer, mixing
- PJ Harvey – producer, mixing, additional engineer
- Catherine Marks – assistant engineer
- Andrew Savors – assistant engineer
- Ali Chant – additional engineer

Design

- Maria Mochnacz – artwork, photography
- Rob Crane – artwork

== Charts ==
Chart performance for White Chalk
Chart (2007)	Peak position
Australian Albums (ARIA)	24
Austrian Albums (Ö3 Austria)	66
Belgian Albums (Ultratop Flanders)	12
Belgian Albums (Ultratop Wallonia)	33
Danish Albums (Hitlisten)	18
Dutch Albums (Album Top 100)	34
Finnish Albums (Suomen virallinen lista)	32
French Albums (SNEP)	10
German Albums (Offizielle Top 100)	54
Irish Albums (IRMA)	15
Italian Albums (FIMI)	29
New Zealand Albums (RMNZ)	35
Norwegian Albums (VG-lista)	7
Portuguese Albums (AFP)	20
Scottish Albums (OCC)	21
Spanish Albums (PROMUSICAE)	55
Swedish Albums (Sverigetopplistan)	24
Swiss Albums (Schweizer Hitparade)	21
UK Albums (OCC)	11
US Billboard 200	65
US Top Alternative Albums (Billboard)	14
US Top Tastemaker Albums (Billboard)	3

== Certifications and sales ==
Certifications and sales for White Chalk
Region	Certification	Certified units/sales
United Kingdom (BPI)	Silver	60,000^{^}
United States	—	62,000
^{^} Shipments figures based on certification alone.
