= John Parish =

English musician and record producer

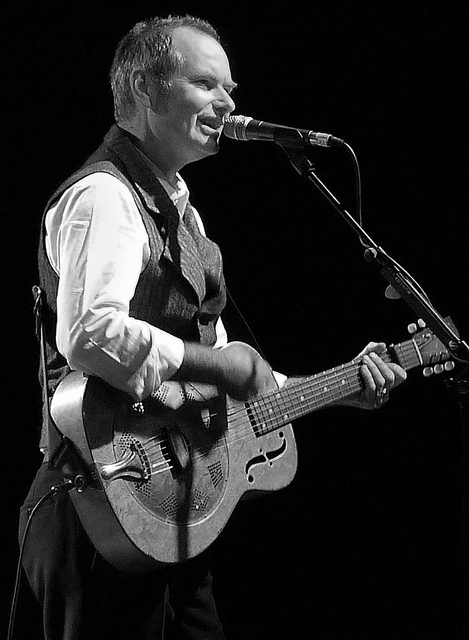
- Parish performing live in July 2011

Background information
- Born: 11 April 1959 (age 67); Yeovil, England
- Origin: Bristol, England
- Genres: Alternative rock, experimental rock
- Occupations: Musician, songwriter, composer, producer
- Instruments: Guitar, keyboards, drums, bass guitar, trombone, percussion, vocals
- Years active: 1983–present
- Labels: Thrill Jockey, Dreamboat
- Website: john-parish.com

John Parish (born 11 April 1959) is an English musician, songwriter, composer and record producer.

Parish is best known for his work with singer-songwriter PJ Harvey. He has also worked with such artists as Eels, Aldous Harding, Tracy Chapman, Giant Sand, and Sparklehorse. His sister is the actress Sarah Parish. Parish was born in Yeovil, Somerset and lives in Bristol. In the 1980s, his girlfriend was Maria Mochnacz.

== Career ==
His first record release was the single "Mind Made" as a member of the British new wave band, Thieves Like Us (1980). In 1982, he formed the band Automatic Dlamini, with Rob Ellis. The changing line-up of Automatic Dlamini included Polly Harvey from 1988 until 1991. Automatic Dlamini recorded three albums: The D Is for Drum (1987), Here Catch Shouted His Father (1990 – unreleased but available as a bootleg), and From a Diva to a Diver (1992). By the time From a Diva to a Diver was released, Harvey had left to form the PJ Harvey trio with ex-Dlamini members Rob Ellis and Ian Olliver, and Parish was playing guitar with Marc Moreland's band the Ensenada Joyride.

In 1986, Parish had begun a parallel career as a record producer working with UK bands including the Chesterfields, the Brilliant Corners, the Caretaker Race and the Becketts. In 1995 he co-produced PJ Harvey's "To Bring You My Love", on which he also played guitar, drums, percussion and organ. He co-wrote and produced the Eels album Souljacker (2001), and played guitar on the world tour that accompanied its release. He has produced and/or played on a number of Howe Gelb / Giant Sand albums and frequently appears onstage with them. Parish produced the Giant Sand album Chore of Enchantment (2000), and a photograph of his wedding in Tucson in 1998 was used as the cover for the 2011 re-release of the record.

He also began working as a film composer in 1998, writing the score for Belgian director Patrice Toye's debut film, Rosie. Parish's score won the Jury Special Appreciation prize at the 1999 Bonn Film & TV Music Biennale. He has since scored another ten soundtracks.

Parish has now worked on seven albums with Harvey, including two co-written albums: Dance Hall at Louse Point (1996) and A Woman a Man Walked By (2009). He played in the PJ Harvey touring band (guitar, drums and keyboards) from 1994 to 1999, from 2009 to 2012 and from 2015 to 2017. He co-produced and played on To Bring You My Love (1995), White Chalk (2007), the Mercury Prize winning Let England Shake (2011), The Hope Six Demolition Project (2016) and I Inside the Old Year Dying (2023).

He has produced and played on three albums by New Zealand singer-songwriter Aldous Harding, two This Is the Kit albums and two albums by Malian artist Rokia Traoré. He has also collaborated several times with two established European stars, the Italian singer Nada and Belgian singer Arno.

== Partial discography ==
=== Solo ===
- Rosie (2000)
- How Animals Move (2002)
- Once Upon a Little Time (2005)
- Screenplay (2013)
- Bird Dog Dante (2018)

=== Scores ===
- Rosie dir. Patrice Toye (1998)
- Water dir. Jennifer Houlton (2004)
- Waltz dir. Norbert Ter (2006)
- Nowhere Man dir. Patrice Toye (2008)
- Going South dir. Sébastien Lifshitz (2009)
- She, a Chinese dir. Xiaolu Guo (2010)
- Little Black Spiders dir. Patrice Toye (2012)
- Tench dir. Patrice Toye (2019)
- Sister dir. Ursula Meier (2012)
- The Farmer's Wife dir. Francis Lee (2012)
- Le Passé devant nous dir. Nathalie Teirlinck (2016)

=== Collaborations ===
- John Parish & Polly Jean Harvey – Dance Hall at Louse Point (1996): Writer, producer, various instruments
- Spleen – Soundtrack to Spleen (1997): Co-writer, guitar, percussion
- Spleen – Little Scratches (1998): Co-writer, guitar, percussion
- Eels – Souljacker (2001): Producer, co-writer, various instruments
- PJ Harvey & John Parish – A Woman a Man Walked By (2009): Writer, producer, various instruments
- Playing Carver (2014): Producer, guitar, vocals
- Kira Skov – Spirit Tree (2021)
- Eels – Extreme Witchcraft (2022): Producer, co-writer, various instruments

=== Productions ===
- PJ Harvey – To Bring You My Love (1995): Producer, guitar, organ, percussion, drums
- Elliot Green - United States (1997): Producer, guitar, keyboard
- 16 Horsepower – Low Estate (1997): Producer, various instruments
- Giant Sand – Chore of Enchantment (2000): Producer
- Bettie Serveert – Private Suit (2000) : Producer
- Thou – Put Us in Tune (2000): Producer, mix
- Dominique A – Auguri (2001): Producer, various instruments
- Morning Star – My Place in the Dust (2001): Producer
- Sparklehorse – It's a Wonderful Life (2001): Co-producer, various instruments
- Tracy Chapman – Let It Rain (2002): Producer
- Thou – I Like Girls in Russia (2004): Producer
- Morning Star – The Opposite Is True (2004): Producer
- Jennie DeVoe – Fireworks and Karate Supplies (2004): Producer
- Nada – Tutto l'amore che mi manca (2004): Producer
- Afterhours – Ballate per piccole iene (2005): Producer and guitar on Ballata per la mia piccola iena
- Dionysos – Monsters in Love (2005): Producer
- PJ Harvey – White Chalk (2007): Producer
- Tom Brosseau – Cavalier (2007): Producer
- Magic Rays – Off the Map (2007) : Producer
- Marta Collica – Pretty and Unsafe (2007) : Producer
- Afterhours – I Milanesi Ammazzano il sabato (14 ricette di quotidiana macabra felicità) (2008): Producer
- Jennie DeVoe – Strange Sunshine(2009): Producer
- This Is the Kit – Krulle Bol (2008): Producer, drums
- Cesare Basile – Storia di Caino (2008): Producer, guitar
- Marta Collica – About Anything (2009): Producer
- Maika Makovski – Maika Makovski (2010): Producer, guitar, drums, bass, banjo
- Kira – Look Up Ahead (2010): Producer
- Zender – Sunday Kids (2010): Mix
- Nive Nielsen and The Deer Children – Nive Sings (2010): Producer, drums, guitar, bongos
- Peggy Sue – Acrobats (2011): Producer
- PJ Harvey – Let England Shake (2011): Producer, guitar, drums, vocals, keyboards, trombone
- Arno – Future Vintage (2012): Producer, guitars, drums
- KT Tunstall – Invisible Empire // Crescent Moon (2013): Mix, steel drums, percussion, timpani, guitar, drums
- Jay Diggins – Searching (2013): Co-producer with Jay Diggins, various instruments
- Mazgani – Common Ground (2013): Co-producer with Mick Harvey, various instruments
- Jenny Hval – Innocence Is Kinky (2013): Producer, guitar, drums, variophon
- Rokia Traoré – Beautiful Africa (2013): Producer
- Jennie DeVoe – Radiator: The Bristol Sessions (2014): Producer
- Arno –Human Incognito (2016): Producer
- PJ Harvey – The Hope Six Demolition Project (2016): Co-producer, various instruments, backing vocals
- Rokia Traoré – Ne so (2016): Producer
- Nadine Khouri – The Salted Air (2017): Producer, various instruments, backing vocals
- Aldous Harding – Party (2017): Producer, mix, guitar, piano, drums, synth, backing vocals
- This Is the Kit – Moonshine Freeze (2017): Producer
- Nada – È un momento difficile, tesoro (2019): Producer, various instruments
- Aldous Harding – Designer (2019): Producer, mix, guitar, piano, organ, mellotron, drums, percussion
- Jesca Hoop – Stonechild (2019)
- Arno – Santeboutique (2020)
- Dry Cleaning – New Long Leg (2021)
- The Goon Sax – Mirror II (2021)
- Aldous Harding – Warm Chris (2022): Producer, various instruments
- Dry Cleaning – Stumpwork (2022)
- Nadine Khouri – Another life (2022): Producer
- PJ Harvey – I Inside the Old Year Dying (2023): Producer, various instruments
- A. Savage – Several Songs About Fire (2023): Producer
- Emily Loizeau – La Souterraine (2024): Producer

=== Featured musician on ===
- PJ Harvey – Is This Desire? (1998): Various instruments
- Goldfrapp – Felt Mountain (2000): Guitar, drums
- M. Ward – Transistor Radio (2005): Drums
- M. Ward – "Primitive Girl" on A Wasteland Companion (2012): Drums, percussion
- Perfume Genius – "Too Bright" (2014): Drums
