= Alan Bean =

American astronaut and lunar explorer (1932–2018)

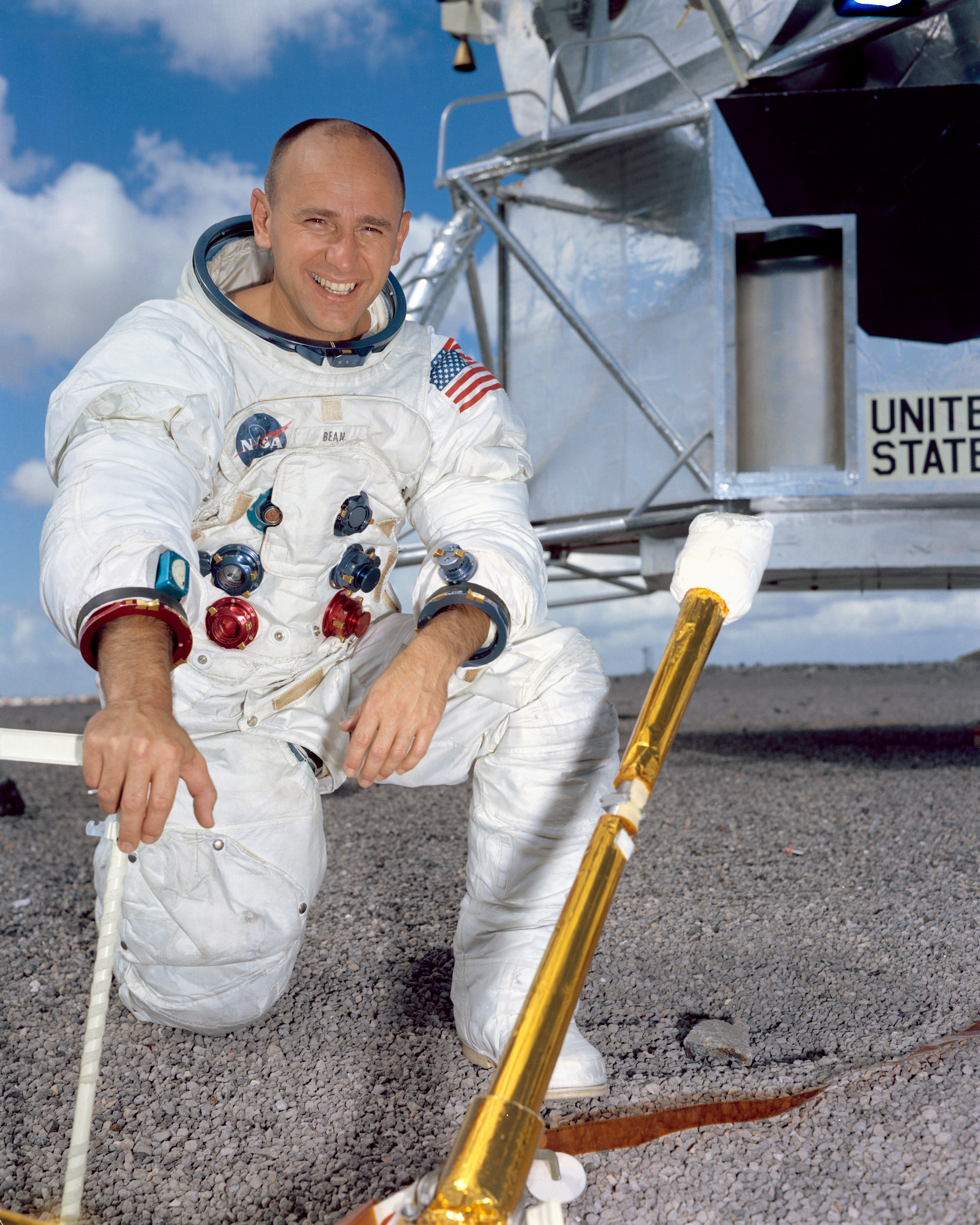
- Bean in 1969
- Born: Alan LaVern Bean; March 15, 1932; Wheeler, Texas, U.S.
- Died: May 26, 2018 (aged 86); Houston, Texas, U.S.
- Resting place: Arlington National Cemetery
- Education: University of Texas, Austin (BS)
- Spouse(s): Sue Ragsdale (m. 1955; div. 1976) Leslie Gombold (m. 1982)
- Children: 2
- Awards: NASA Distinguished Service Medal
- Space career

NASA astronaut
- Rank: Captain, USN
- Time in space: 69d 15h 45m
- Selection: NASA Group 3 (1963)
- Total EVAs: 3
- Total EVA time: 10h 12m
- Mission: Apollo 12; Skylab 3
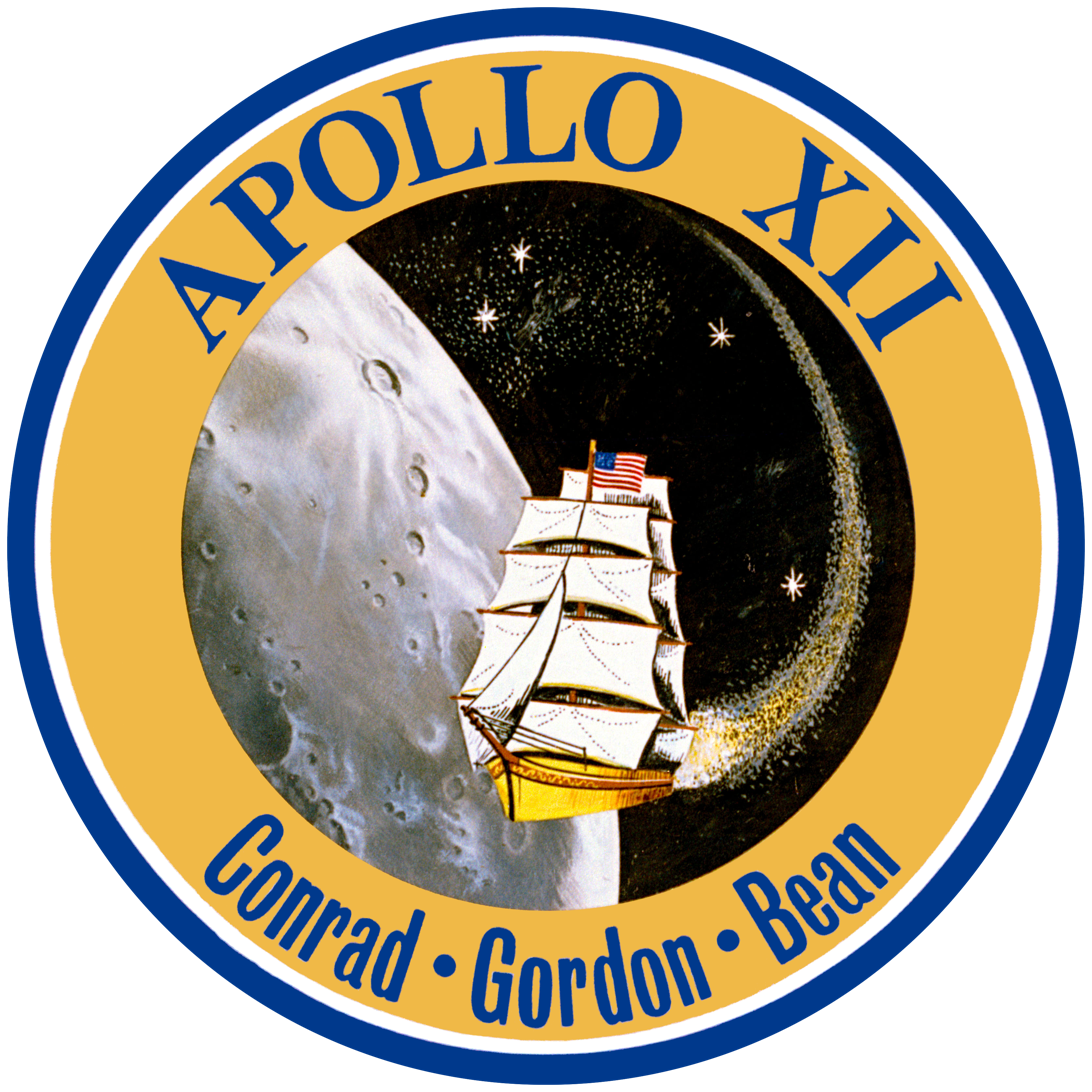
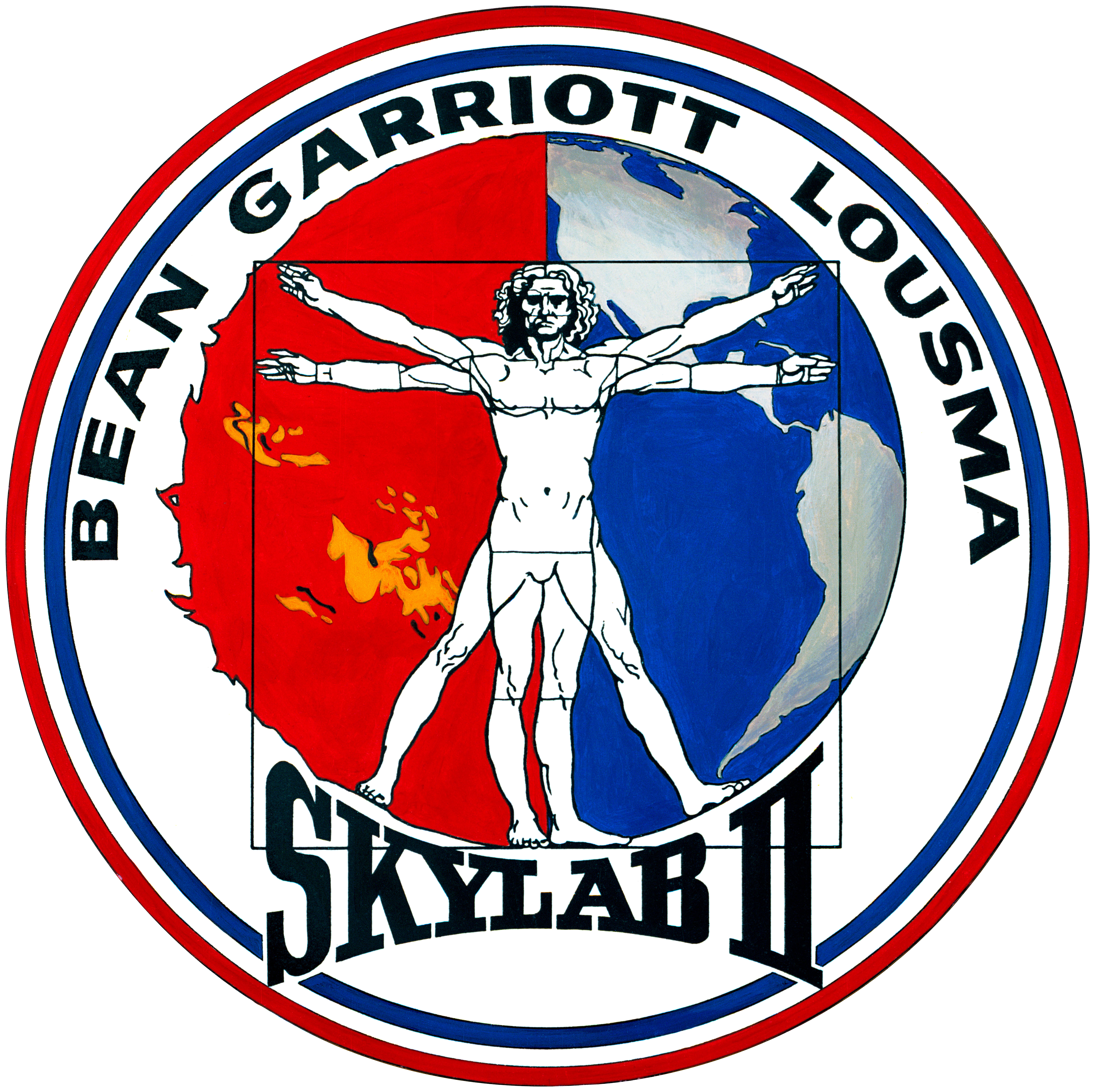
- Mission insignia
- Retired: June 1981

Alan LaVern Bean (March 15, 1932 – May 26, 2018) was an American naval officer and aviator, aeronautical engineer, test pilot, NASA astronaut and painter. He was selected to become an astronaut by NASA in 1963 as part of Astronaut Group 3, and was the fourth person to walk on the Moon.

Before becoming an astronaut, Bean graduated with a Bachelor of Science degree in aeronautical engineering from University of Texas at Austin in 1955 and re-joined the U.S. Navy—he served as an enlisted member for a year after his high school graduation. He received his naval aviator wings in 1956 and served as a fighter pilot. In 1960, he graduated from the U.S. Naval Test Pilot School, flew as a test pilot and was The New Nine selection finalist in 1962.

Bean made his first flight into space aboard Apollo 12 in November 1969, the second crewed mission to land on the Moon. He spent over seven hours walking on the Moon during two lunar excursions. He made his second and final flight into space on the Skylab 3 mission in 1973, the second crewed mission to the Skylab space station.

After retiring from the United States Navy in 1975 and NASA in 1981, Bean pursued his interest in painting, depicting various space-related scenes and documenting his own experiences in space as well as those of his fellow Apollo program astronauts. He was the last living crew member of Apollo 12.

== Biography ==
=== Early life and education ===
Bean was born March 15, 1932, in Wheeler, the seat of Wheeler County in the northeastern Texas Panhandle, to parents Arnold Horace Bean and Frances Caroline Bean (née Murphy). He considered Fort Worth his hometown. He was of Scottish descent. As a boy, he lived in Minden, the seat of Webster Parish in northwestern Louisiana, where his father worked for the U.S. Soil Conservation Service. Bean was a Boy Scout and he earned the rank of First Class. He graduated from R. L. Paschal High School in Fort Worth, Texas, in 1949. Following his high school graduation in 1949, Bean enlisted in the U.S. Naval Reserve.

Bean received a Bachelor of Science degree in aeronautical engineering from the University of Texas at Austin in 1955, where he attended on a Naval Reserve Officers Training Corps (NROTC) scholarship. While at the university, he also joined the Delta Kappa Epsilon fraternity.

=== Military service ===
He was an Electronics Technician Striker at the NAS Dallas, Texas, until September 1950, when he was honorably discharged. In January 1955, Bean was commissioned a U.S. Navy ensign through the NROTC at the University of Texas at Austin, and attended flight training. After completing flight training in June 1956, he was assigned to Attack Squadron 44 (VA-44) at NAS Jacksonville, Florida, from 1956 to 1960, flying the F9F Cougar and A4D Skyhawk. After a four-year tour of duty, he attended the U.S. Naval Test Pilot School (USNTPS) at NAS Patuxent River, Maryland, where his instructor was his future Apollo 12 Commander, Pete Conrad, graduating in November 1960. Bean took art classes at St. Mary's College of Maryland during this tour, and flew as a test pilot on several types of naval aircraft. Following his assignment at USNTPS and aviation safety training with the University of Southern California (USC), he went through additional instruction with his old Attack Squadron 44, and was assigned to Navy Attack Squadron VA-172 at NAS Cecil Field, Florida, flying the A-4 Skyhawks, during which time he was selected as a NASA astronaut.

Bean logged more than 7,145 hours of flying time, including 4,890 hours in jet aircraft.

=== NASA career ===
Bean was selected by NASA as part of Astronaut Group 3 in 1963 (after not being selected for Astronaut Group 2 the previous year). He was selected to be the backup command pilot for Gemini 10, but was unsuccessful in securing an early Apollo flight assignment. He was placed in the Apollo Applications Program in the interim. In that capacity, he was the first astronaut to dive in the Neutral Buoyancy Simulator and was a champion of the process for astronaut training. When fellow astronaut Clifton Williams was killed in an air crash, a space was opened for Bean on the backup crew for Apollo 9. Apollo 12 Commander Conrad, who had instructed Bean at the Naval Test Pilot School years before, personally requested Bean to replace Williams.

==== Apollo program ====
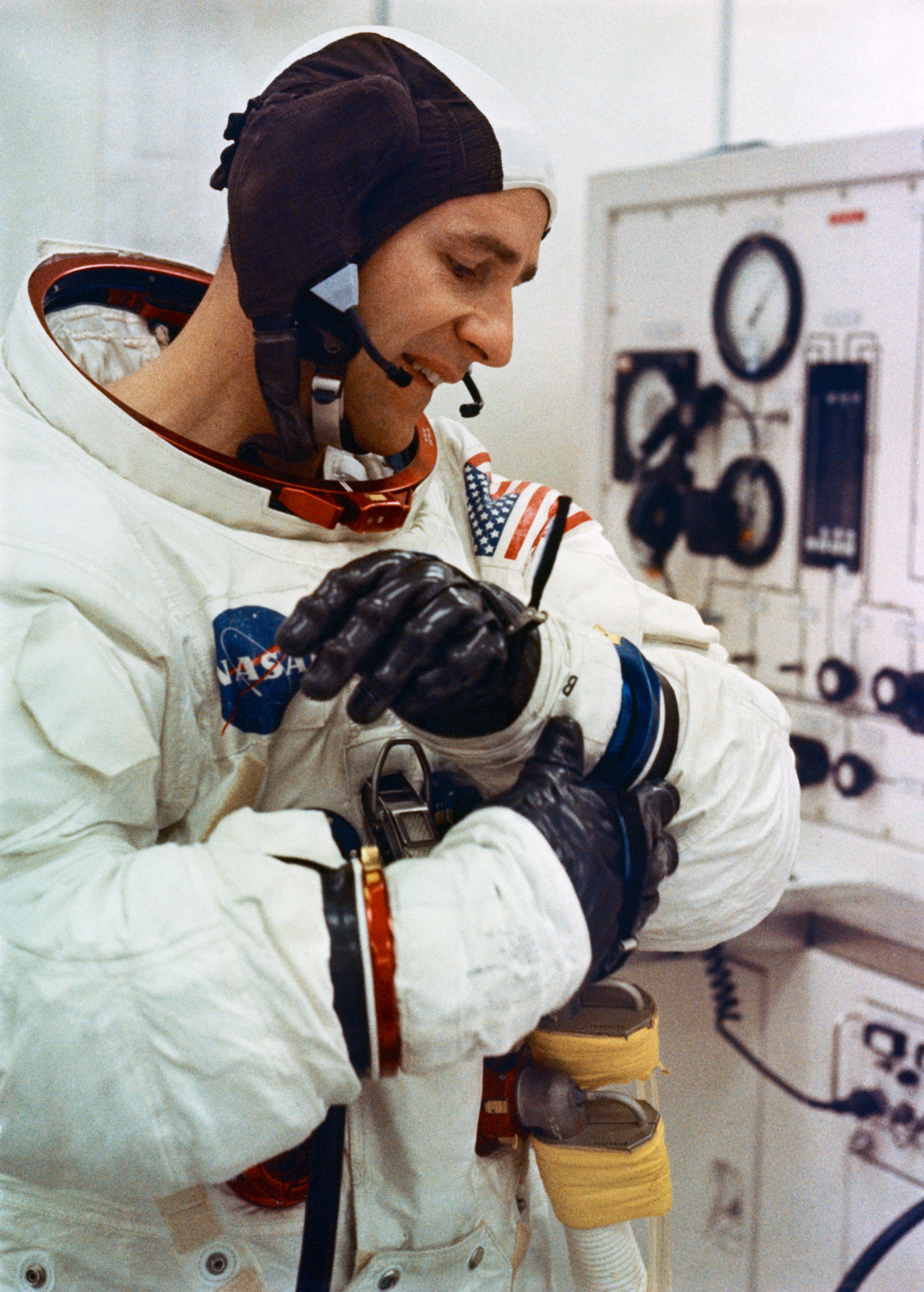
Bean during suiting-up for Apollo 12 flight

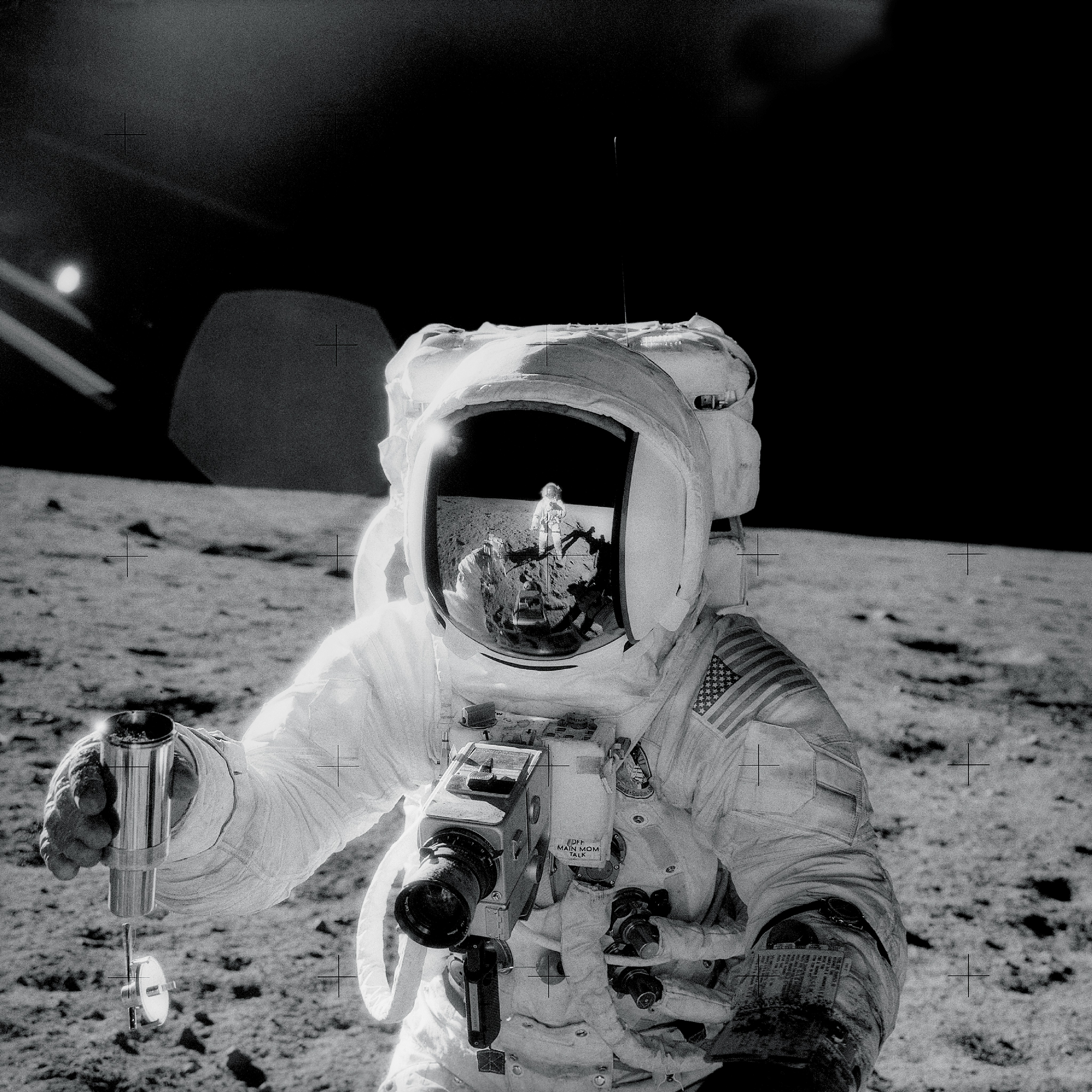
Bean on the Moon during Apollo 12

Bean was the Apollo Lunar Module pilot on Apollo 12, the second lunar landing. In November 1969, Bean and Pete Conrad landed on the Moon's Ocean of Storms—after a flight of 250,000 miles and a launch that included a harrowing lightning strike. He was the astronaut who executed John Aaron's "Flight, try SCE to 'Aux'" instruction to restore telemetry after the spacecraft was struck by lightning 36 seconds after launch, thus salvaging the mission. They explored the lunar surface, deployed several lunar surface experiments, and installed the first nuclear power generator station on the Moon to provide the power source. Dick Gordon remained in lunar orbit, photographing landing sites for future missions.

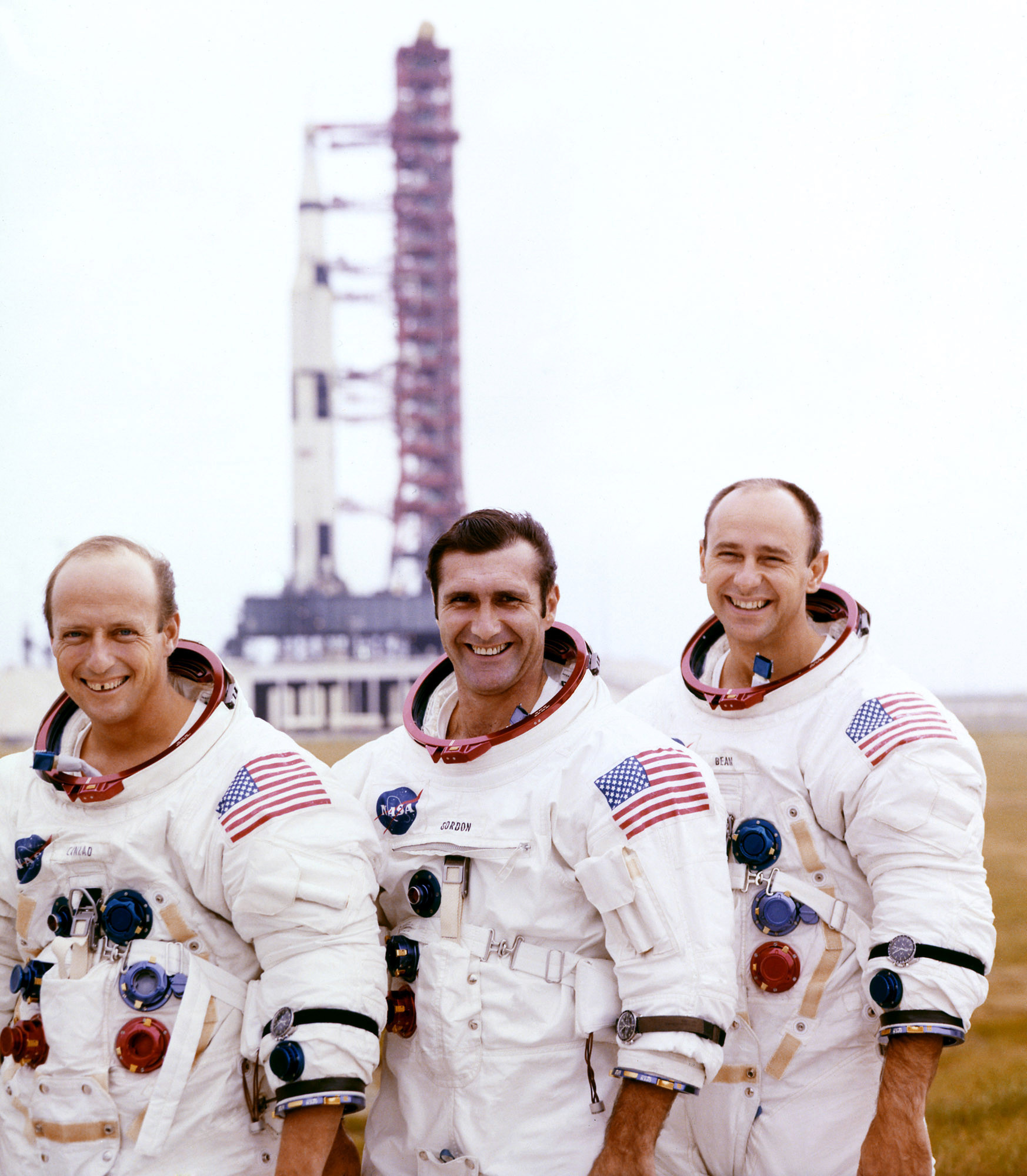
Pete Conrad, Dick Gordon, and Alan Bean pose with their Apollo 12 Saturn V Moon rocket in the background on the pad at Cape Canaveral on October 29, 1969

Bean had planned on using a self-timer for his Hasselblad camera to take a photograph of both Pete Conrad and himself while on the lunar surface near the Surveyor III spacecraft. He was hoping to record a good photo, and also to confuse the mission scientists as to how the photo could have been taken. However, neither he nor Conrad could locate the timer in the tool carrier tote bag while at the Surveyor III site, thus lost the opportunity. After finding the self-timer unit at the end of the EVA, when it was too late to use, he threw it as far as he could. His paintings of what this photo would have looked like (titled The Fabulous Photo We Never Took) and one of his fruitless search for the timer (Our Little Secret) are included in his collection of Apollo paintings.

Bean's suit is on display in the National Air and Space Museum.

==== Skylab ====
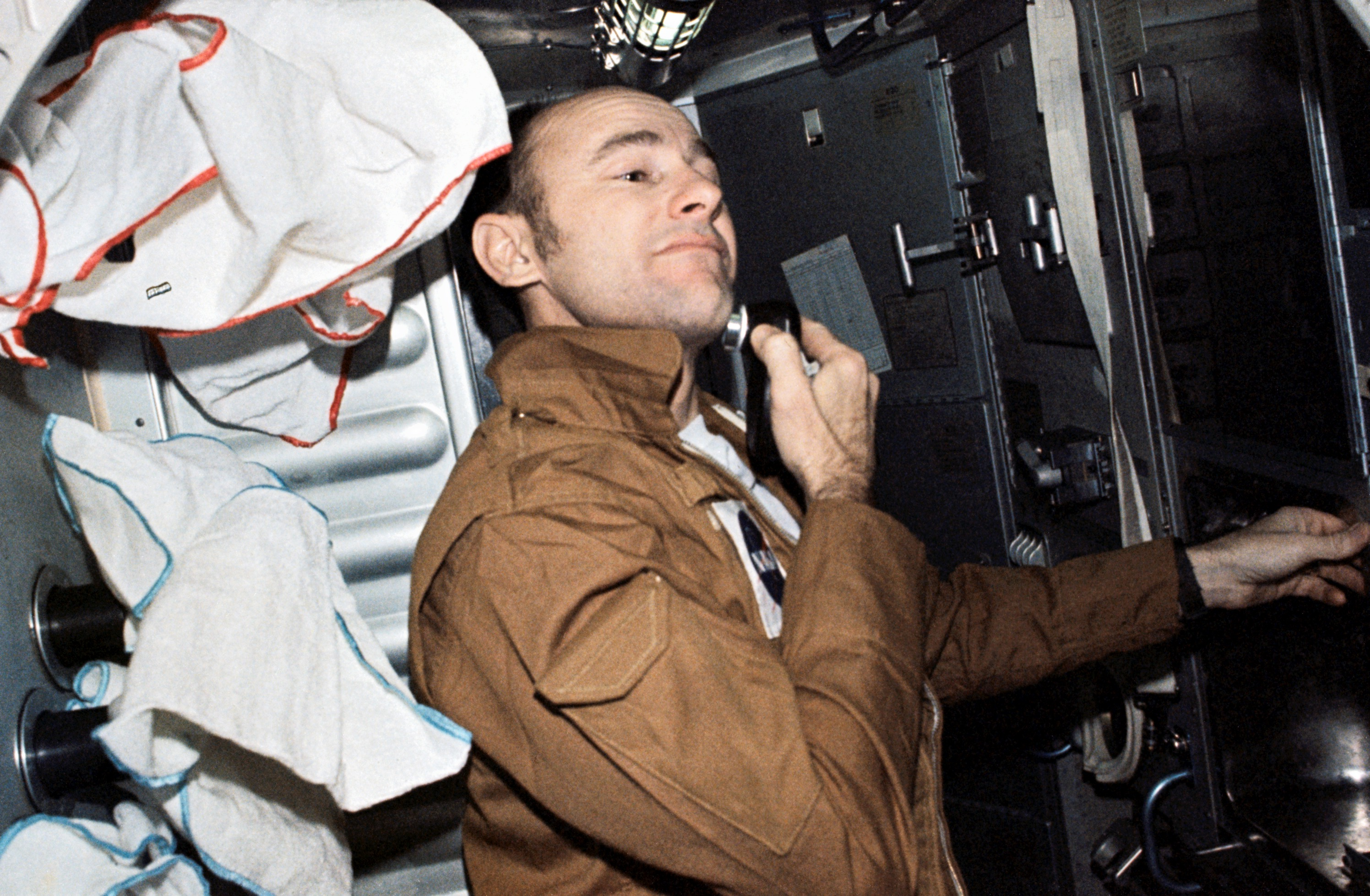
Bean shaving during the Skylab 3 mission

Bean was the spacecraft commander of Skylab 3, the second crewed mission to Skylab, from July 29 to September 25, 1973. With him on the mission were scientist-astronaut Owen Garriott and Marine Corps Colonel Jack R. Lousma. Bean and his crew were on Skylab for 59 days, during which time they covered a world-record-setting 24.4 million miles. During the mission, Bean tested a prototype of the Manned Maneuvering Unit and performed one spacewalk outside the Skylab. The crew of Skylab 3 accomplished 150% of its mission goals.

=== Post-NASA career ===
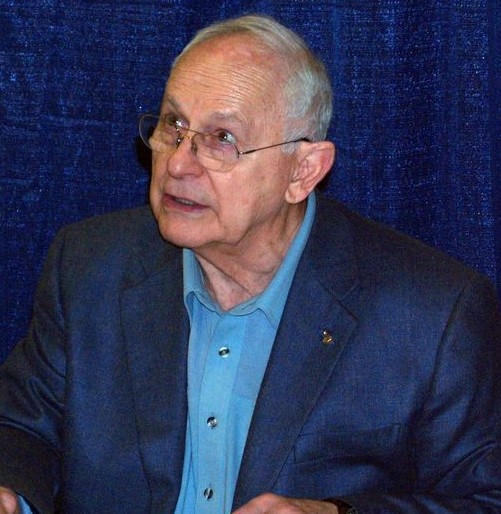
Bean, February 2009

On his next assignment, Bean was the backup spacecraft commander of the United States flight crew for the joint American-Russian Apollo–Soyuz Test Project (ASTP).

Bean retired from the Navy in October 1975 as a captain, and continued as head of the Astronaut Candidate Operations and Training Group within the Astronaut Office in a civilian capacity.

Bean logged 1,671 hours and 45 minutes in space while at NASA, of which 10 hours and 26 minutes were spent in EVAs on the Moon and in Earth orbit.

== Painting ==
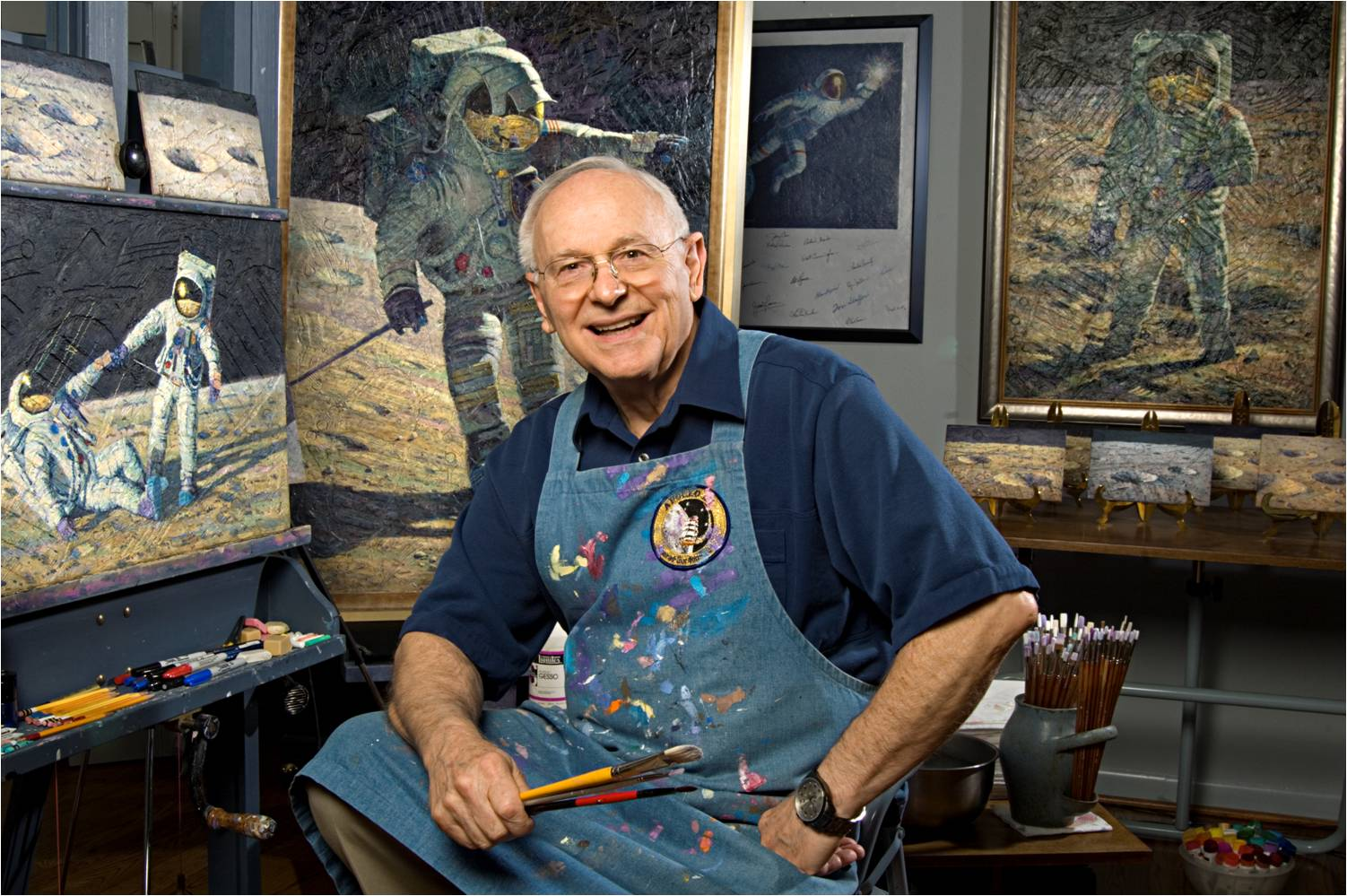
Bean in his studio in 2009

Bean resigned from NASA in June 1981 to devote his time to painting. He said his decision was based on that, in his 18 years as an astronaut, he was fortunate enough to visit worlds and see sights no artist's eye, past or present, has ever viewed firsthand and he hoped to express these experiences through his art.

As a painter, Bean wanted to add color to the Moon. "I had to figure out a way to add color to the Moon without ruining it," he remarked. In his paintings, the lunar landscape is not a monotonous gray, but shades of various colors. "If I were a scientist painting the Moon, I would paint it gray. I'm an artist, so I can add colors to the Moon", said Bean.

Bean's paintings include Lunar Grand Prix and Rock and Roll on the Ocean of Storms, and he used real Moon dust in his paintings. When he began painting, he realized that keepsake patches from his space suit were dirty with Moon dust. He added tiny pieces of the patches to his paintings, which made them unique. He also used a hammer, used to pound the flagpole into the lunar surface, and a bronzed Moon boot to texture his paintings.

In July 2009, for the 40th anniversary of the Apollo 11 Moon landing, Bean exhibited his lunar paintings at the Smithsonian Institution's National Air and Space Museum in Washington.

But I'm the only one who can paint the Moon, because I'm the only one who knows whether that's right or not.

— Bean describing his Moon painting capability

== Personal life and death ==
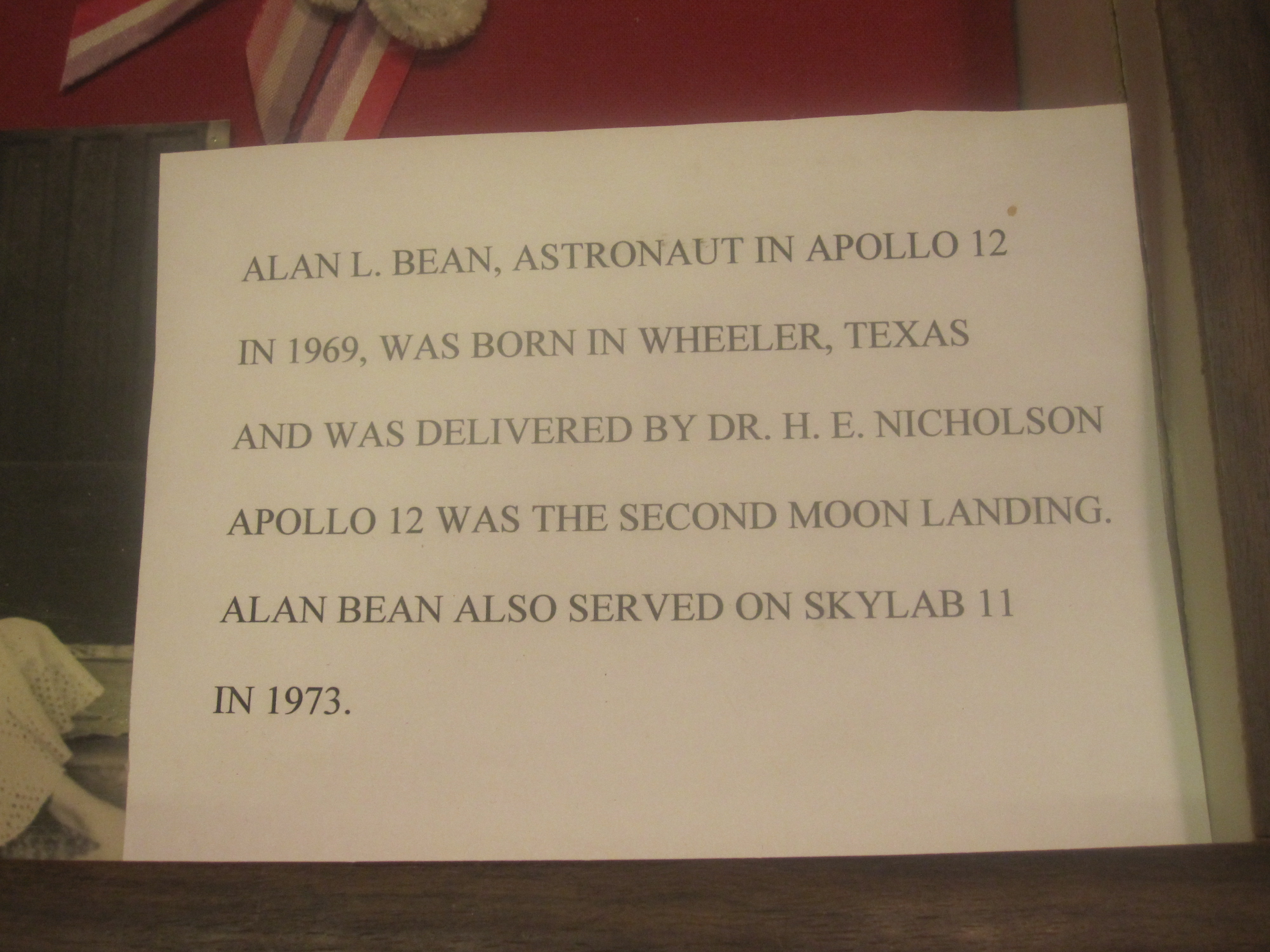
Alan Bean museum marker in Wheeler, Texas

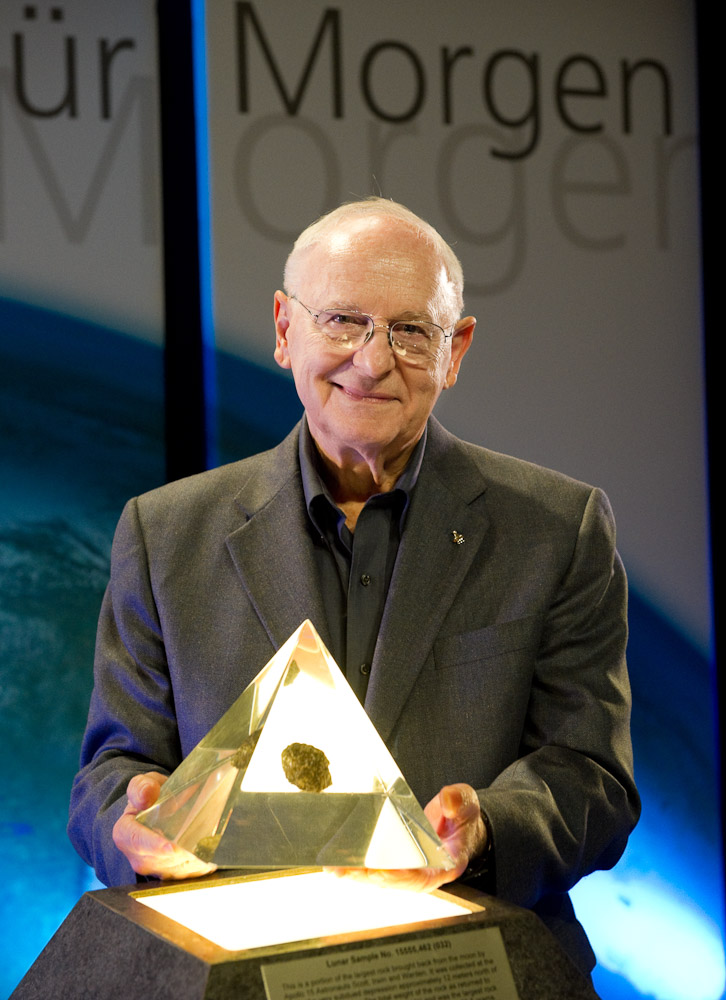
Bean presents a piece of Moon rock at the Gasometer Oberhausen in March 2010

Bean took a piece of Clan MacBean tartan to the Moon. In recognition of his Scottish ancestry, Bean stated:

As I remember it, I took Clan McBean tartan to the Moon and returned it to Earth. […] I did, in fact, give a piece of the tartan to the Clan McBean and also to the St Bean Chapel in Scotland. And I've still got some of it in my possession. I did not, however leave any of it on the Moon.

He married Sue Ragsdale, a fellow graduate of the University of Texas on April 19, 1955, shortly before her graduation. With Ragsdale, Bean had a son, Clay, and a daughter, Amy Sue.

Bean died on May 26, 2018, in Houston, Texas, at the age of 86. His death followed the sudden onset of illness two weeks before while he was in Fort Wayne, Indiana. At the time of his death, Bean was married to his second wife, Leslie, and was also survived by his sister, Paula Scott.

Bean was interred in Arlington National Cemetery on November 8, 2018.

== Legacy ==
He won several awards and decorations during his career. He received the Rear Admiral William S. Parsons Award for Scientific and Technical Progress, the Godfrey L. Cabot Award for 1970, the National Academy of Television Arts and Sciences Trustees Award, the V. M. Komarov Diploma for 1973 and the AAS Flight Achievement Award for 1974.

Bean received the Navy Astronaut Wings, the Navy Distinguished Service Medal (twice), the NASA Distinguished Service Medal (twice), and the National Defense Service Medal with bronze star.

Bean was inducted into the International Space Hall of Fame in 1983, the U.S. Astronaut Hall of Fame in 1997, the International Air & Space Hall of Fame in 2010, and the National Aviation Hall of Fame for 2010. He was also a fellow of the American Astronautical Society and a member of the Society of Experimental Test Pilots.

Bean received the University of Texas Distinguished Alumnus Award in 1970 and the Distinguished Engineering Graduate Award. Bean, the first Texan to walk on the Moon, was awarded the Texas Press Associations Texan of the Year Award for 1969. The 1973 Robert J. Collier Trophy was awarded to NASA and the Skylab crew. Bean was awarded an Honorary Doctorate of Science from Texas Wesleyan College in 1972, and was presented an Honorary Doctorate of Engineering Science degree from the University of Akron (Ohio) in 1974. The city of Chicago held a parade and presented gold medals to the Skylab astronauts in 1974. Bean was the recipient of Fédération Aéronautique Internationale's prestigious Yuri Gagarin Gold Medal for 1973 in Sydney, Australia. In 1975, President Ford presented Skylab commander Gerald Carr with the Dr. Robert H. Goddard Memorial Trophy at a White House ceremony, on behalf of all Skylab astronauts (including Bean). Bean was a co-recipient of AIAA's Octave Chanute Award for 1975, along with fellow Skylab 3 astronauts Jack Lousma and Owen Garriott. In 2019, Northrop Grumman named the spacecraft for the NG-12 mission the S.S. Alan Bean.

== In media ==
In the 1998 HBO miniseries From the Earth to the Moon, Bean was portrayed by Dave Foley. Swedish indie pop artist Stina Nordenstam has a song called "The Return of Alan Bean" on her 1991 debut album Memories of a Color. British indie rock band Hefner released a single called "Alan Bean" in 2001, writing from the perspective of Bean during Apollo 12. The song was included on their Dead Media album, and songwriter Darren Hayman re-recorded it with The Wave Pictures for 2009's for Madrid, as well as solo in 2019 for 12 Astronauts. For her 2019 novel, America Was Hard to Find, American writer Kathleen Alcott based her description of the Apollo landing on interviews she conducted with Bean.

== Books ==
- My Life As An Astronaut (1989) ISBN 978-0671674250
- Apollo: An Eyewitness Account (with Andrew Chaikin) (1998) ISBN 978-0867130508
- Into the Sunlit Splendor: The Aviation Art of William S. Phillips (with Ann Cooper, Charles S. Cooper and Wilson Hurley) (2005) ISBN 978-0867130935
- Mission Control, This is Apollo: The Story of the First Voyages to the Moon (with Andrew Chaikin) (2009) ISBN 978-0670011568
- Painting Apollo: First Artist on Another World (2009) ISBN 978-1588342645

Bean's in-flight Skylab diary is featured in Homesteading Space: the Skylab Story, a history of the Skylab program co-authored by fellow astronauts Dr. Joseph Kerwin and Dr. Owen Garriott and writer David Hitt, published in 2008.

== See also ==
- List of spaceflight records
- The Astronaut Monument
