= Matthew J. Saunders =

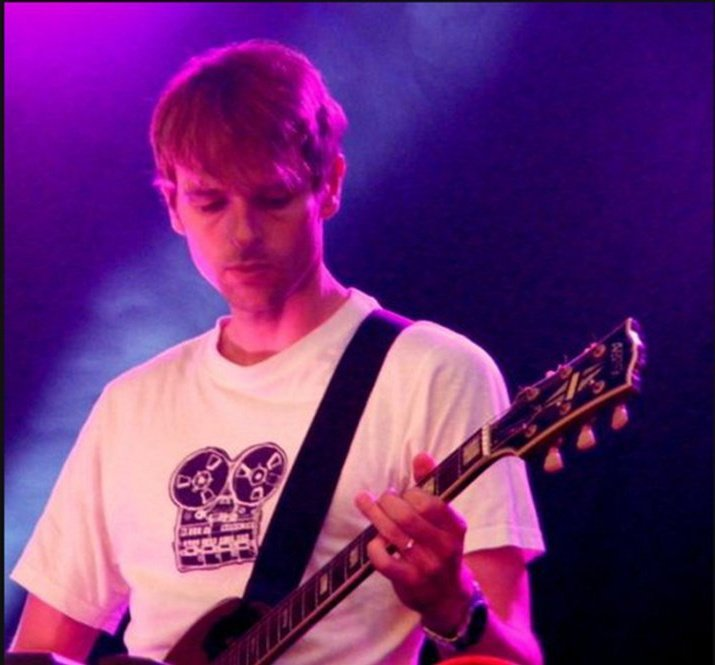
- Matthew J. Saunders, 2006

Background information
- Born: 5 January 1972 (age 54); Birmingham, England, United Kingdom
- Genres: electronica; film score; tv; hauntology
- Occupations: Composer, Mastering Engineer
- Years active: 1995–present
- Website: matthewjsaunders.bandcamp.com
- Magnétophone

Matthew J. Saunders (born 5 January 1972) is an English composer, mastering engineer, and visual designer. During the first decade of the 21st century he was signed to 4AD Records — a British major independent label home to The Pixies, Cocteau Twins, Scott Walker and many others. He records and performs as Twilight Sequence, Magnétophone, The Assembled Minds, Rapid Eye Electronics Ltd. and also runs the record label Patterned Air Recordings.

On 4AD, as one half of the art-rock electronic band Magnétophone (John Hanson being the other), he released two albums, three EPs and a 7" single. It was an unusual signing for 4AD, Magnétophone's first album being almost all instrumental, and this departure piqued the interest of journalists and fans of the label and band equally. The band were the first signing after the corporate restructuring of 4AD when co-founder Ivo Watts-Russell departed and the album was seen as a signpost of where the newly reinvented label might be heading

Before signing to 4AD, Saunders released records on several influential record labels including Static Caravan Recordings, Earworm Records, Spaceage Recordings and Ochre Records. He has recorded two Peel Sessions for BBC Radio One, two sessions for BBC Radio One's Rob da Bank, as well as sessions for BBC Radio 3 and XFM.

Saunders has collaborated on record with significant artists such as rock legends Kim Deal and Kelley Deal, Scottish folk legend and Mercury Music Prize nominee King Creosote, infamous drone rock band Spacemen 3's Peter Kember (who also joined Magnétophone as a performing member and manager in 2006–2008), Scottish folk singer/songwriter James Yorkston and others — all tracks that appeared on Magnétophone's second 4AD album, The Man Who Ate the Man or related 12" releases.

He is currently releasing records as "Twilight Sequence" and is signed to Castles in Space Records where he has released a 7" single on the subscription library, an etched 12" with artwork by Zeke Clough (this 17 minute track was used as the soundtrack to a public photography exhibition of hedges curated by Gareth Gardner), and a vinyl album.

He is also known for his solo electronic recordings as The Assembled Minds, having released two albums and numerous singles and remixes on a variety of record labels, gaining critical acclaim from magazines such as The Wire and Self-Titled Magazine, from music author and journalist Simon Reynolds, and numerous national radio plays on stations such as BBC Radio 6

Saunders worked on the feature documentary film Valentino: The Last Emperor and is a credited composer on IMDb. He has also had music synced by BBC World News in daily continuity pieces and Sky in cross-network adverts. According to the official website, he is currently composing music for media in addition to running mastering house 808 Hz, where he has mastered albums by artists such as Wire front man Colin Newman, Eva Bowan, Malka Spigel, Anthony Reynolds, and Jon Thorne

In 2007 Saunders contributed a Magnétophone track to a prestigious arts project by New York publishing house Visionaire, a work called Visionaire No. 53: Sound, which saw him appear on record alongside artists such as Yoko Ono, Michael Stipe, U2, Liza Minnelli, Lalo Schifrin, David Byrne, Ad-Rock, Courtney Love and others. Each artist was asked to provide a unique piece of music which was then pressed across five pieces of vinyl and a cd, was housed in a large dome receptical and supplied with a record player in the form of a battery powered car.

== Discography ==
Albums

Matthew J Saunders

- (2026) playing the guitar as a means to open a portal, digital album (Patterned Air)

Twilight Sequence

- (2026) Stars of the Wayside, CD album (Lunar Module Records)
- (2026) Corbies, track on compilation The Silent Harvest Volume One (Folk Police)
- (2025) Protomurk Book One, CD album accompanying graphic novel by artist Zeke Clough (Castles in Space)
- (2024) A Travel Companion for the Avid Field Recordist, CDr (Patterned Air)
- (2023) Outline of Nature, vinyl LP (Castles in Space)
- (2022) Trees In General: And the Larch, 12" vinyl (Castles in Space)
- (2022) Looking at Lifeforms, 7" vinyl (Castles in Space)
- (2021) Analogue Studies at Dawn and Dimmity, digital (Patterned Air)

Assembled Minds

- (2020) Dirty Workshop Magick, digital (Patterned Air Recordings)
- (2019) Psychogeographic Audio Explorations Along the A303 Vol.1, 8" vinyl (Patterned Air Recordings)
- (2011) Tomorrow Curves, Assembled Minds, CD (Patterned Air Recordings)
- (2015) Creaking Haze and Other Rave Ghosts, CD (Patterned Air Recordings)

The Matthew Machine

- (2021) auto-autumnal generative soundwave bath, digital (Patterned Air Recordings)

Magnétophone

- (2000) I Guess Sometimes I Need to Be Reminded of How Much You Love Me (4AD)
- (2005) The Man Who Ate the Man (4AD)
- (2006) Promo Phone 1 (Ensnare)

Singles, EPs, and various

- "You Should Write Music" (1998, 7" single, Earworm)
- "Air Methods" (1998, 7" single, Static Caravan)
- "Box Flow" (1999, 'Infrasonic Waves' compilation, 7", Ochre)
- "Lights in the Eye" (1999, 7" single, Active Suspension)
- "Temporary Lid" EP (1999, 12" EP, Static Caravan)
- "The Science Must Continue" (as Tape Recorder, 1999, 12" comp, Earworm)
- "Lubeecha" – Lathe Cut (2000, 7" single, Earworm)
- "Eve Transmission" (2000, 'Interface' compilation, CD, Spaceage Recordings)
- "Little Boy's Acorn" (2000, '4WD Motion' compilation, CD, 4AD)
- "Come on the 'Phone" EP (2000, 12" and CD EP, 4AD)
- "Relax, It's the End of Electronica" (2002, 7" single, Static Caravan)
- "I Hear Blonde Falcons" (2002, '10p 1 Play' compilation CD, Robots and Electronic Brains Magazine)
- "Kel's Vintage Thought" (2004, 12" EP, 4AD)
- "...And May Your Last Words Be a Chance to Make Things Better" (2005, 7" single, 4AD)
- "...And May Your Last Words Be a Chance to Make Things Better" (2006, CD compilation, Sunday Best)
- "Systems Thinking Business Modelling Consultant" (2006 compilation, Magazine/CD, Esopus Magazine (Spring))
- "22 Calibre Family" (2006 compilation, 'A Mind Expansion Compilation', CD, Mind Expansion)
- "Much Less Than A Day" (2007, 'Binary Oppositions' CD compilation, Static Caravan)
- "Much Less Than A Day: Edit" (2008, 'Visionaire 53' 12" and CD compilation, Visionaire)
- "The Old Silver In and Out" (2008, 'György Ligeti Tribute', online compilation, Topher)

Remixes of Matthew J Saunders / Magnétophone

- "Kel's Vintage Thought – Outhud Remix" (2004, 4AD)
- "MNPLIE4AD – Lost in Edit by JM Lapham" (The Earlies) Remix (2005, 4AD)
- "Benny's Trip – Sonic Boom Remix" (2006, 4AD)

Remixes by Matthew J Saunders / Magnétophone

- "Run From Safety" (2007 Octoberman – Run From Safety LP, White Whale)
- "Antiphon" (2004, Charles Atlas Remix compilation, Audraglint)

DJ mixes of Matthew J Saunders / Magnétophone

- "Kel's Vintage Thought – Outhud Remix" (2005 Glimmers – DJ Kicks, !K7)

== Radio sessions ==
- Wire Magazine mix (2017)
- Self-Titled Magazine mix (2017)
- BBC Radio 1 John Peel Session, Maida Vale Studio (2000)
- BBC Radio 1 John Peel Session, Live in Birmingham (2000)
- XFM John Kennedy Session, Live in London (2001)
- BBC Radio 3 Mixing It Session, Live in London (2001)
- BBC Radio 1 Rob da Bank Session, Maida Vale Studio (2005)
- BBC Radio 1 Blue Room Session, The Earlies' Studio / Echo Gate Studio (2005)

== Film ==
- Valentino: The Last Emperor — Acolyte Films/StudioCanal (2008)
