= Derrin Schlesinger =

British television producer

- Born: Derrin Schlesinger; England, UK
- Occupation: Producer
- Years active: 1990–present
- Awards: BAFTA TV Award nomination

Derrin Schlesinger is a British producer, known for producing The IT Crowd, Nathan Barley, The Book Group and Fur TV. In 2007 she was nominated for the BAFTA TV Award for The IT Crowd which was nominated for the Situation Comedy Award.

== Filmography ==
- Crime 101 (2026)
- American Animals (2018)
- Four Lions (2010)
- 33X Around the Sun (2005)
- Mule (2002)
- Mudchute (2001)
- To Have and to Hold (2000)

== Television ==
- Babylon (2014)
- Southcliffe (2013)
- Noel Fielding's Luxury Comedy (2012)
- Octavia (2009)
- Fur TV (2008)
- The IT Crowd (2007–2008)
- Ladies and Gentlemen (2007)
- Nathan Barley (2005)
- The Book Group (2003)

== Videography ==
- Hefner - The Sweetness Lies Within (1998)
