= The Greedy Ugly People =

Single by Hefner

from the album We Love the City
- Released: 2000
- Genre: indie rock
- Label: Too Pure
- Songwriter: Darren Hayman

Hefner singles chronology
"Good Fruit" (2000)	"The Greedy Ugly People" (2000)	"'We Love the City'" (2000)

"The Greedy Ugly People" is a single by British indie rock band Hefner. Released in 2000 by Too Pure, it was the second single from their album We Love the City. The song placed in UK singles chart and in BBC Radio 1 DJ John Peel's Festive Fifty chart.

The b-side on the second compact disc, "Don’t Give Up On Us Babe", was originally recorded by David Soul.

== Track listing ==
An alternate cover of the single.

The single was released on four formats, two compact discs and two vinyl records.

=== CD1 ===
1. "The Greedy Ugly People"
2. "Milkmaids"
3. "Kate Cleaver’s House"

=== CD2 ===
1. "The Greedy Ugly People"
2. "Everything is Falling Apart"
3. "Don’t Give Up On Us Babe"

=== 7" ===
1. "The Greedy Ugly People" (Baxendale remix)
2. "The Greedy Ugly People" (Electric Sound of Joy remix)

=== 12" ===
1. "The Greedy Ugly People" (Baxendale extended remix)

== Charts ==
In October 2000, "The Greedy Ugly People" spent one week in the UK Singles Chart, peaking at number 64. It also reached number 10 in the UK Independent Singles Chart.
