= God Is on My Side (disambiguation) =

God Is on My Side is an album by Richie Stephens

God Is on My Side may also refer to:

- "God Is on My Side", God Is on My Side
- "God Is on My Side", Breaking God's Heart
- "God Is on My Side", Tony Christie
