= Appliance (band) =

British band

- Origin: Exeter, England
- Genre: Post-rock
- Years active: 1995–2003
- Label: Mute
- Past members: James Brooks; Michael Parker; David Ireland; Stuart Christie
- Website: Appliance's Facebook page. https://soundcloud.com/applianceband Soundcloud page

Appliance were a British experimental post-rock three piece band, who released four albums between 1999 and 2003 on Mute Records.

== History ==
Formed in Exeter in 1995, the band originally comprised James Brooks (guitar), David Ireland (percussion) and Stuart Christie (bass). Christie left in 1995 to form Harmony 400, and was replaced by Michael Parker.

They released three 10-inch vinyl EPs on various independent record labels, including their own self-financed Surveillance Records, before signing with Daniel Miller's Mute Records in 1999.

The band's first album for mute was Manual (1999), and was positively received by critics.

The mini-album Six Modular Pieces followed in 2000, an album of "droning, atmospheric" tracks, described by AllMusic as "lo-fi garage numbers with layers of textured guitars, bleep effects, and vintage synthesizers", and regarded by the NME as "a creative breakthrough".

Imperial Metric (2002) was seen as more diverse, with AllMusic's Tim DiGravina identifying Neu!, Joy Division and The Velvet Underground as influences, describing the album as "deceptively complex, melodic, and timeless mood music". Pitchfork's Paul Cooper drew additional comparisons to artists including David Bowie, OMD and Spacemen 3, and saw the album as an improvement on Appliance's previous work. He called it "a fascinating blend of post-punk dub, primitive electronics, and Soviet-menace nostalgia". Noel Gardner, reviewing for the NME was less impressed, viewing the music as dated, and calling the band "just another troupe of high-minded post-rock paranoiacs".

The band's fourth album, Are You Earthed? (2003) had what Billboard described as "a more organic sound". It was well received by AllMusic, with Ned Raggett giving it a four-star review, while CMJ New Music Monthly's Richard M. Juzwiak was less impressed. Both Mojo and Uncut gave it 7/10 ratings.

Championed by John Peel, the band recorded five Peel Sessions during their career, also making the 1999 Festive Fifty with "Food Music", and one in 2003 for Jeff Cooper's radio2XS.

They toured live in Europe and the UK with, amongst others, Add N to X, Goldfrapp, Snow Patrol, Six By Seven, Hefner and Wire. The band have not performed or recorded since the Montreux Jazz Festival in 2003.

In October 2010, the RROOPP label released Appliance, Reconditioned, a retrospective 3-CD boxed set of early recordings, unreleased material and Peel sessions.

In 2011, guitarist James Brooks, as Land Observations, released the EP Roman Roads on Enraptured Records. He has since released the albums Roman Roads IV–XI (2012) and The Grand Tour (2014) on Mute Records.

== Musical style ==
Their music was inspired by Krautrock, a 1970s Germanic experimental movement involving minimalist song structures, mantra-like rhythms, drones and repetition. Often described as "post-rock", they used home-made guitar effects extensively, including their own creation, the 'Tritone'. They also used a huge array of instruments, with more than 50 listed as being used on Manual.

Critics drew comparisons with Kraftwerk, Neu!, Stereolab, and Spacemen 3.

== Discography ==
=== EPs and singles ===
- Organised Sound EP, (1997), Surveillance
- Into Your Home EP, (1997), Plastic Cowboy
- "Outer" / "Rev A" 7" single, (1998), Earworm
- Time and Space EP, (1998), Enraptured
- "Pacifica" (1999), Mute
- "Food Music" (1999), Mute
- Appliance In Session EP (1999), Mute - promotional only
- D4 EP (2000), Mute
- "Personal Stero" (2000), Mute
- "A Gentle Cycle Revolution" (2001), Mute
- "Land, Sea And Air" (2001), Mute
- Untitled Tour EP (2002), Mute
- "Go Native" (2003), Mute

=== Albums ===
- Manual (1999), Mute
- Six Modular Pieces (2000), Mute
- Imperial Metric (2001), Mute
- Are You Earthed? (2003), Mute

Compilation album

- Appliance, Reconditioned (2010), RROOPP
