= Electric Sound of Joy =

- Origin: Chesterfield, Derbyshire, England
- Genres: Post-rock; indie electronic
- Years active: 1994–early 2000s
- Labels: Earworm, Foundry
- Past members: Greg Kurcewicz; Ben Rodgers; Scott Nicholas; Dan Hayhurst; John Revill

Electric Sound of Joy were an English post-rock group formed in Chesterfield in 1994. They released an eponymous album in 1999 and also recorded a Peel Session.

== History ==
The group was formed in 1994 by Greg Kurcewicz (vocals/Guitar), Ben Rodgers (keyboards), Scott Nicholas (guitar), Dan Hayhurst (bass guitar), and John Revill (drums). After two limited-edition singles on the Earworm label and a November 1997 session for John Peel's BBC Radio 1 show, Kurcewicz left the band in 1998, and they shifted to a more electronic instrumental sound that has been compared to Cluster and Stereolab. The band were described by the NME: "Like Air, they manage to be chic and cheerful, allowing a potentially icy groove to melt into a fantastic fanfare of sizzling synths", and by The Independent as "dark, broody instrumentals with a distinctive hook; spiritually morose, yet full of zeal and strangely uplifting". They performed at the Reading Festival in 1998 and signed to Foundry Records the same year. After an EP in late 1998, the band's eponymous debut album was issued in September 1999.

The band also remixed Hefner's "The Greedy Ugly People", which was released on a 7-inch single and on the expanded edition of We Love the City.

Kurcewicz and Hayhurst later collaborated with The Sonic Catering Band, and Hayhurst played on the latter's live album Live in Linz – Popkorn (2008). he also played in Echoboy, They Came from the Stars, and Sculpture.

Greg Kurcewicz still works as a musician, artist and film curator.

Scott Nicholas produces moody lo-fi psychedelic folk-rock under the Venus Willendorf moniker.

== Discography ==
=== Albums ===
- Electric Sound of Joy (1999), Foundry

=== Singles, EPs ===
- "Total Turn" (1997), Earworm
- "Play Away" (1997), Earworm
- Food of the Range EP (1998), Foundry
- Daughters of Destruction EP (2000), Foundry
