= Good Fruit =

2000 song performed by Hefner

Single by Hefner

from the album We Love the City
- Released: 2000
- Genre: Indie rock
- Label: Too Pure
- Songwriter: Darren Hayman

Hefner singles chronology
"'Boxing Hefner'" (2000)	"Good Fruit" (2000)	"The Greedy Ugly People" (2000)

"Good Fruit" is a single by British indie rock band Hefner. Released in 2000 by Too Pure, it was from the album We Love the City. The song placed in UK singles chart and BBC Radio 1 DJ John Peel's Festive Fifty chart. Amelia Fletcher contributed backing vocals on the song.

== Track listing ==
The alternate cover for the "Good Fruit" single.

The single was released in three formats:

=== CD1 ===
1. "Good Fruit"
2. "Jubilee"
3. "Blackhorse Road"

=== CD2 ===
1. "Good Fruit"
2. "I Will Make Her Love Me"
3. "Seafaring"

=== 7" ===
1. "Good Fruit" (The Wisdom of Harry Remix)
2. "Good Fruit" (Piano Magic Remix)

== Chart performance ==
Chart (2000)	Peak position
UK Indie (OCC)	5
UK Singles (OCC)	50
