= VA-44 (U.S. Navy) =

Attack Squadron 44
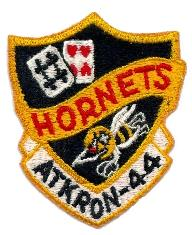
- VA-44 insignia
- Active: 1 June 1945 – 8 June 1950
- Country: United States
- Branch: United States Navy
- Type: Attack squadron
- Part of: Inactive
- Nickname(s): Hornets

Aircraft flown
- Attack: SB2C Helldiver; A-1 Skyraider; AM Mauler

Attack Squadron 44 (VA-44) was an attack squadron of the United States Navy. Originally established as Bombing Squadron VB-75 on 1 June 1945 it was redesignated Attack Squadron VA-3B on 15 November 1946, redesignated VA-44 on 1 September 1948 and disestablished on 8 June 1950. A second VA-44 was in service from 1 September 1950 until disestablishment on 1 May 1970.

== Operational history ==
- 4 June 1945: The squadron began its first flight operations.
- January–February 1946: VB-75 deployed aboard USS Franklin D. Roosevelt for her shakedown cruise to the Caribbean and Brazil. While visiting Rio de Janeiro the squadron, air group, and carrier represented the U.S. at the inauguration of Brazilian president, Eurico Dutra.

== See also ==
- History of the United States Navy
- List of inactive United States Navy aircraft squadrons
- List of United States Navy aircraft squadrons
