= Alan Bean (song) =

Single by Hefner

from the album Dead Media
- Released: 2001
- Genre: Indie rock
- Label: Too Pure
- Songwriter: Darren Hayman

Hefner singles chronology
"Half a Life" (2001)	"Alan Bean" (2001)	"Dead Media" (2001)

Alternative cover
- Alternative cover

"Alan Bean" is a single by British indie rock band Hefner. It was released on three formats by Too Pure in 2001. It peaked at #58 in the UK singles chart and #4 in the Independent Singles Chart. The song also reached at #31 in the John Peel BBC Radio 1 Festive Fifty for 2001.

The title song is about astronaut Alan Bean, who was the fourth person to walk on the Moon. The band had the opportunity to speak to Bean as a surprise guest on Dutch broadcasting company VPRO. Songwriter Darren Hayman re-recorded "Alan Bean" with The Wave Pictures for 2009's for Madrid, as well as solo in 2019 for 12 Astronauts.

All the tracks from all three formats were later included in the 2011 re-issue of the Dead Media album.

== Track listing ==
The single was released on three formats.

=== CD1 ===
1. "Alan Bean"
2. "Horror Show"
3. "A Better Man"

=== CD2 ===
1. "Alan Bean"
2. "Just Take Care"
3. "Charlie Girl"

=== 7" ===
1. "Alan Bean" (Rothko remix)
2. "Alan Bean" (Munit remix)
