= Four Lions =

2010 British film directed by Chris Morris

- Theatrical release poster
- Directed by: Chris Morris
- Written by: Chris Morris; Jesse Armstrong; Sam Bain
- Produced by: Mark Herbert; Derrin Schlesinger
- Starring: Riz Ahmed; Kayvan Novak; Nigel Lindsay; Arsher Ali; Adeel Akhtar
- Cinematography: Lol Crawley
- Edited by: Billy Sneddon
- Production companies: Film4 Productions; Wild Bunch; Warp Films
- Distributed by: Optimum Releasing
- Release dates: 23 January 2010 (Sundance); 7 May 2010
- Running time: 101 minutes
- Country: United Kingdom
- Languages: English; Urdu; Punjabi; Arabic
- Budget: £2.5 million
- Box office: £6 million

Four Lions is a 2010 British satirical black comedy film directed by Chris Morris (in his directorial debut) from a screenplay written by Morris, Sam Bain and Jesse Armstrong. It stars Riz Ahmed, Kayvan Novak, Nigel Lindsay, Arsher Ali and Adeel Akhtar as a group of incompetent jihadi terrorists who attempt to bomb the London Marathon, but who are all too stupid to actually form a set plan.

Production on Four Lions began in late 2008, with writing partners Armstrong and Bain hired to complete the screenplay. Prior to this, Morris spent several years researching for the film, conducting interviews with terrorism and religion experts, law enforcement, and British Muslims. Principal photography took place in May 2009, with filming primarily done on location in Sheffield.

Four Lions premiered at the Sundance Film Festival on 23 January 2010, and was released in the United Kingdom on 7 May, by Optimum Releasing. The film grossed £6 million worldwide and received positive reviews from critics, with praise for the screenplay, direction, themes, humour, and cast performances (particularly Ahmed and Novak).

== Plot ==
Four radicalised British Muslims living in Sheffield (three of whom are British Pakistanis) aspire to become suicide bombers: Omar, who is deeply critical of Western society and interventionism; his dim-witted and anxious cousin Waj; Barry, a bad-tempered and rash English convert; and the naive Faisal. When Omar and Waj travel to an al-Qaeda-affiliated training camp in Pakistan, Barry recruits a fifth member, Hassan, after witnessing him pretending to commit a suicide bombing at a conference. The training in Pakistan ends in disaster when Omar accidentally destroys part of the camp while attempting to shoot down a drone, and the pair are forced to flee. Omar uses the experience to assert authority over the group on his return to Britain.

The group disagrees about what their target should be. Barry wants to bomb a local mosque as a false flag operation to "radicalise the moderates" and Faisal suggests blowing up a Boots because it sells contraceptives. Ahmed, Omar's conservative, pacifist brother, tries to talk him out of doing anything violent; however, Omar and his wife, Sofia, mock Ahmed for his unwillingness to be in the same room as a woman, and accuse him of keeping his wife in a cupboard. Sofia instigates a water gun fight with him, prompting Ahmed to leave in a huff. After the group begins production of the explosives, Hassan is left to watch the safehouse as Barry, Waj and Faisal test detonate a small amount of TATP contained in a microwave, using a nearby fireworks show to cover the sound.

When they return, they find Hassan dancing with an oblivious neighbour. The group suspects they have been compromised and transport the explosives to a new location in grocery bags. Faisal trips up while crossing a field and is killed in the explosion. This angers Omar, who berates the others and leaves. Faisal's head is found, tipping off the authorities, and Omar tells the others and they reconcile. Omar decides to target the upcoming London Marathon due to having access to mascot costumes, which they use to conceal the bombs. Meanwhile, armed police raid Omar's brother's house.

At the Marathon, Waj expresses doubts about the morality of their plot, but Omar convinces him to go through with it. A police officer approaches the group, which leads Hassan to attempt to alert the officer about their plot, but he is killed when Barry remotely detonates his bomb. The remaining three panic and run away as the police search for them. Omar has a change of heart, feeling guilt about manipulating Waj into dying for a cause he does not understand and attempts to prevent the attack. Two police snipers receive Omar's description, a man dressed as the Honey Monster, but one of them mistakenly kills a bystander in a Wookiee costume.

Waj is cornered by police in a kebab shop and takes the staff hostage. Omar calls Waj and convinces him to let all but one of the hostages go. Barry finds Omar, snatches his phone, and swallows the SIM card. However, as Barry begins to choke, a well-meaning passerby attempts to perform the Heimlich manoeuvre, forcing Omar to flee before Barry's bombs are inadvertently detonated, with his death leaving the remaining terrorists with no set plan.

Omar hurries to a nearby phone store to buy a new SIM card to contact Waj but leaves empty-handed. He spots a colleague and borrows his phone. Omar attempts to talk Waj down, but his call is interrupted when the police charge in and kill the remaining hostage, whom they mistake for Waj. Waj's bomb is then detonated, killing everyone in the kebab shop. Distraught, Omar walks into a nearby pharmacy and detonates his own bomb, killing himself to avoid further bloodshed.

In an epilogue, it is revealed the police later arrested Omar's innocent brother as a terrorist and abducted him to a black site; that they deflected responsibility for shooting the hostage and the bystander; and that Omar unknowingly killed Osama bin Laden when misfiring the rocket in Pakistan.

== Cast ==
- Riz Ahmed as Omar, a security guard and the most rational member of the terrorist cell
- Kayvan Novak as Waj, Omar's gullible and child-like cousin
- Nigel Lindsay as Barry / Azzam Al-Britani, an ill-tempered white convert and the founder of the "Islamic State of Tinsley"
- Adeel Akhtar as Faisal, a naive member who always trusts Barry
- Arsher Ali as Hassan Malik, a rapper who joins the cell after Barry witnesses him pretending to blow himself up in protest at a conference
- Craig Parkinson as Matt, a security guard and Omar's coworker
- Preeya Kalidas as Sofia, Omar's wife and a nurse in a local hospital
- Julia Davis as Alice
- Benedict Cumberbatch as Ed, a Special Branch negotiator
- Alex Macqueen as Malcolm Storge MP, a member of the Counter Terrorism Strategy Unit
- Kevin Eldon as Sniper
- Darren Boyd as Sniper
- Mohammad Aqil as Mahmood, Omar's young son
- Wazim Takir as Ahmed, Omar's devoutly conservative but pacifist brother
- William El-Gardi as Khalid

== Production ==
Morris spent three years researching the project, speaking to terrorism experts, police, the secret service, and imams, as well as ordinary Muslims, and writing the script in 2007. In a separate interview, he asserts that the research predated the 7 July 2005 London bombings:

It was an attempt to figure it out, to ask, "What's going on with this?" This [the "War on Terror"] is something that's commanding so much of our lives, shaping so much of our culture, turning this massive political wheel. I was wondering what this new game was all about. But then 7/7 hit that with a fairly large impact, in that we were suddenly seeing all these guys with a Hovis accent. Suddenly you're not dealing with an amorphous Arab world so much as with British people who have been here quite a long time and who make curry and are a part of the landscape. So you've got a double excavation going on.

Chris Morris explained that Jesse Armstrong and Sam Bain were brought into the project as "experts in the school of male psychology, plus they have technical expertise and experience of comedy dialogue." Armstrong and Bain provided the first script, which Morris subsequently rewrote and edited.

Riz Ahmed initially declined the role of Omar but later signed on as he felt the film "challenged stereotypes". He received Morris' attention after writing a song called "Post 9/11 Blues" which he wrote about being detained at Luton Airport after the screening of the docudrama Road to Guantanamo in Berlin.

Morris suggested in a mass email, titled "Funding Mentalism", that fans could contribute between £25 and £100 each to the production costs of the film and would appear as extras in return. Funding was secured in October 2008 from Film 4 Productions and Warp Films, with Derrin Schlesinger & Mark Herbert producing. Filming began in Sheffield in May 2009, with scenes being filmed in the City Centre, inside Meadowhall Shopping Centre and the district of Meersbrook.

Morris has described the film as a farce, which exposes the "Dad's Army side to terrorism". During the making of the film, the director sent the script to former Guantánamo Bay detainee Moazzam Begg. Begg has said that he found nothing in the script that would be offensive to British Muslims. Riz Ahmed also contacted Begg, to ask whether the subject matter was "too raw". When the film was completed, Begg was given a special screening and said that he enjoyed it.

The film's music supervisor was Phil Canning. The song "Avril 14th" by electronic musician Aphex Twin plays during the film's ending credits.

== Release and reception ==
The film premiered at the Sundance Film Festival in January 2010 and was short-listed for the festival's World Cinema Narrative prize. Introducing the film's premiere, Morris said: "I feel in a weird way that this is a good-hearted film. It's not a hate film, so I would hope that aspect would come through."

The UK première took place at the National Media Museum as part of Bradford International Film Festival on 25 March 2010, and was followed by a nationwide release on 7 May. The UK premiere at the National Media Museum in Bradford was followed by a question and answer session with Chris Morris, Jesse Armstrong, Sam Bain, three of the principal actors, and two of the producers. Morris stated that he does not find the film at all controversial and that attempting to cause controversy is "one of the most boring things you can do". Morris also gave a talk introducing the film at a summer 2010 screening at Latitude Festival in Suffolk.

Despite its acclaim at the Sundance Film Festival, Four Lions failed to find a distributor in the U.S. for nine months, until the newly formed Drafthouse Films picked it up. The film had a limited release in the US on 5 November 2010.

Four Lions was released in the UK on DVD and Blu-ray on 30 August 2010, and in the U.S. on 8 March 2011.

=== Critical response ===
Four Lions received positive reviews from critics. Rotten Tomatoes gives the film a score of 84%, based on 136 reviews, with an average rating of 7.3/10. The site's consensus reads, "Its premise suggests brazenly tasteless humor, but Four Lions is actually a smart, pitch-black comedy that carries the unmistakable ring of truth." Metacritic gives the film a score of 68 out of 100, based on 28 critics.

The Daily Telegraph wrote that "[Chris Morris's] evocations of the claustrophobic mundanity of the Muslims' lives, their querulous banter, their flimsily pick 'n' mix approach to the Koran all feel painfully, brilliantly real." The Daily Express rated Four Lions four out of five and praised the performances in particular, calling the film "brilliantly cast with all the actors displaying sharp comic timing and both [Riz] Ahmed and [Kayvan] Novak also bringing out the touching humanity of their characters".

Upon its screening at Sundance, the Los Angeles Times and The Hollywood Reporter gave the film positive reviews, the latter describing the film as "a brilliant takedown of the imbecility of fanaticism" drawing comparisons with This Is Spinal Tap (1984) and The Three Stooges.

Amongst the reviewers that gave the film negative and mixed reviews were Nigel Andrews of the Financial Times, who called the film a "spectacular miss" and The Guardian's Jeremy Kay, who wrote "as a satire on terror, Four Lions seems to be a missed opportunity". Andrew Pulver, also writing for The Guardian, gave the film a more favourable review, stating that "Chris Morris is still the most incendiary figure working in the British entertainment industry".

=== Box office ===
Despite an initial release on just 115 screens across the UK, the film was successful at the box office on its opening weekend, generating the highest site average of all the new releases (£5,292) and making a total of £609,000. According to the Official Top 10 UK Film Chart (7–9 May 2010), Four Lions was placed at sixth, behind Iron Man 2, Furry Vengeance, A Nightmare on Elm Street, Hot Tub Time Machine and The Back-up Plan. Due to its popularity, Optimum Releasing increased the number of screens showing the film to 200.

As of 8 August 2010, Four Lions grossed £2,932,366 at the UK box office. As of 2013, Four Lions' worldwide gross was $6,149,356.

=== Accolades ===
Time magazine rated the film as among Top 10 movies of 2010.

Two lead actors, Kayvan Novak and Nigel Lindsay, were nominated for Best Comedy Performance in Film at the British Comedy Awards 2010. Kayvan Novak went on to win the award, thanking all his "brothers", referring to his fellow actors in Four Lions.

At the 64th British Academy Film Awards, Morris won the BAFTA Award for Outstanding British Debut, with the film also receiving a nomination for Outstanding British Film.

== See also ==
- List of films featuring drones
