= Magnétophone =

English electronic/art rock band

Magnétophone are a band from Birmingham, England, composed of Matthew J Saunders (born 1972) and John Hanson (born 1973). Since their inception in the mid-1990s they have released two albums, I Guess Sometimes I Need to Be Reminded of How Much You Love Me and The Man Who Ate the Man, plus numerous singles and EPs and are currently signed to the record label 4AD. Magnétophone rose to international recognition out of a period of vibrant musical activity in the second city, which also spawned contemporaries Broadcast.

== Biography ==
Matthew J Saunders and John Hanson formed Magnétophone in 1995 after they met at an art school on the outskirts of Birmingham in 1992. Their musical backgrounds followed similar lines in that they both played in rock-influenced bands.

Saunders began experimenting with keyboards and computer soundchips (C64 SID chip in particular) around 1986, composing instrumental three voice music and sound effects. Inspired by rock'n'roll and the possibilities of audio 'art', in 1989 he took up his 'neighbour's neglected guitar' and began forming bands in the style of the Beatles and Led Zeppelin, playing pubs and clubs around Birmingham city centre.

Hanson's first steps into music also began in the mid-1980s, and at the local community centre playing drums in the basement, in drop-in style workshops. Later, he discovered acoustic guitar and his 'first love', the bass, and went on to form bands also playing Led Zeppelin-esque tracks.

Despite the similarity of their respective bands their paths didn't cross until 1992 when they enrolled on an art course at Solihull College. Here, they developed a friendship, sharing their enthusiasm for Spacemen 3, Suicide, Steve Reich, Talk Talk, Aphex Twin, Woody Allen, painting, printmaking and photography. At this time, both their bands simultaneously began to disintegrate leading them to form their own outfit Rocket Science.

Rocket Science's first gig was at The Jug of Ale in Moseley, Birmingham. The duo played simple FM synthesis keyboards put through numerous guitar effects pedals, acoustic guitar, bass guitar and various tone generators and used a four-track recorder to play back a combination of processed found sounds, film dialogue, and distorted breakbeats. Their music at this early stage was instrumental and often repetitive, recalling the sounds of early techno-ambient albums by Aphex Twin, and the lush washes of Brian Eno. Performing music that required a certain level of calm and concentration on the part of the audience brought with it certain concerns: "We were finding that the quieter tracks were getting talked over to the point where you'd feel like you may as well stop and get up and go to the bar with them. We found to get around this, we had to make our beats and sounds louder and fiercer, so it was harder to talk over."

Magnetophone's music was at odds with the Brit Pop indie guitar bands that predominated in the second city's venues; consequently, from 1998 to 1999 Saunders and Hanson organised and promoted their own night of 'alternative' music entitled 'We Brought Our Friends'.

During this time, the duo sent out demos to record labels, and one in particular caught the attention of London label Earworm Records. "You Should Write Music" backed by "Monitor Rocket Science" became the band's first 7" single, and prompted the change of name from Rocket Science to Magnétophone.

This first single was met with great enthusiasm by the press, and by fellow musicians, including Spacemen 3's Sonic Boom who met the band at a 'We Brought Our Friends' show and later worked and performed with them. A series of other singles, 12"s, and compilations followed, and a long-term relationship with Static Caravan Recordings began.

The records between 1998 and 2000 showed the basis of the Magnétophone sound to be rooted in the electronic field, but it was also moving outside of it as its 'organic-ness' and obvious human intervention and performance appeared to be informed by guitar bands like My Bloody Valentine and MC5, and it is this that separates them from other electronica records of the same period and which caught the attention of 4AD's A&R department. These records were still instrumental and took in elements of drum'n'bass, IDM, ambient-techno and avant-garde sound sculpting, and were tied together by strong, though sometimes hidden or intermittent melodies. The pieces were performed live and captured as whole performances, rather than being multi-tracked. John Peel was an ardent supporter of the band's output at this time and they recorded two Peel sessions, one at the BBC Maida Vale Studios, and one at the Irish Centre in a live performance in Birmingham in 2000.

In March 2000, the band completed their debut LP I Guess Sometimes I Need to Be Reminded of How Much You Love Me, which was subsequently released by 4AD (where they remain signed today) to great critical acclaim in some quarters. The BBC used one of the tracks from this album, "So Much As Hold My Hand", on their World Service as the theme music for links between programmes and news bulletins. Their work since this LP has included collaborations with Kim Deal and Kelley Deal, King Creosote, James Yorkston, The Mountain Goats and Sonic Boom. In 2004, Magnétophone's track 'Kel's Vintage Thought', co-written with The Breeders' Kelley Deal, was voted by listeners of BBC 6 Music as the Rebel Playlist winner on the Steve Lamacq show. Their second LP, The Man Who Ate The Man, was released in 2005 and was voted best avant-post rock album of 2005 by Piccadilly Records. Shortly after its release, in late 2005, Magnétophone recorded a session for BBC Radio 1's Blue Room show at the Maida Vale Studios, and for BBC Radio 1's Rob da Bank show, both broadcast in November 2005.

In 2007, Magnétophone contributed to Birmingham UK/Italian artist-collaboration-compilation Binary Oppositions which was a coming together of visual and audio art produced by Birmingham-based artists. Later that year New York art-house publication Visionaire released an audio media package called Visionaire 53 which brought together many disparate artists in the producing of one-minute-only pieces of music. Magnétophone contributed to this release along with other artists including Yoko Ono, U2, Michael Stipe, Pet Shop Boys, Cindy Sherman and it consisted of five records, 2 CDs, a record player and dome container.

In 2008, Magnétophone contributed an instrumental track called "The Old Silver In and Out" to an online tribute compilation to classical and electronic composer György Ligeti, who scored music for Eyes Wide Shut, 2001: A Space Odyssey and The Shining. The compilation included Mike Paradinas's u-ziq and Moyokoyani & His Robot Orchestra and all the tracks were supplied as free downloads.

2008 also saw a new development from Magnétophone with the duo setting up a record label called Test Conditions to release dubstep and electronica. Saunders' solo productions are recorded under the alias of Veil and latterly The Assembled Minds.

== The Magnétophone sound ==
Magnétophone's records reference a number of different influences from Silver Apples, Suicide, My Bloody Valentine and Spacemen 3, to The Human League, Talk Talk, and Velvet Underground. However, one is not more apparent than the other and their music is more accurately a mixture of genres rather than bands: psychedelia, electronica, folk, synthpop, post-rock, ambient, pop. Their sound is a meeting of the broken and organic and the beautiful and systematised, and the progression of their sound through their eleven-year career, spans dysfunctional electronic instrumental pieces, to 'bewitching, mysterious' city-folk songs.

Magnétophone's melodies, whether sung or played on an instrument, are supported by dirty, scratchy synths, solid electro and acoustic breaks, detuning guitars and sonic 'artefacts' that blink-in and out of the audio picture-frame seemingly at random. Tape hiss, projector clicks, fireworks, fragments of human voices move around sometimes contrapuntal, sometimes monophonic arrangements. The time signatures are generally 4/4 or 6/8.

The lyrics of The Man Who Ate The Man are more poetic than rock'n'roll inspired, and concern city relationships ("Benny's Insobriety" and "Without Word") or similar, but set against a rural backdrop ("A Sad Ha Ha (Circled My Demise)" and "The Only Witching You'll be Doing"). The themes explore control, loss, reverence, worth, relationship-pacts.

Much of Magnétophone's music from the early singles to the first LP is notable for its 'challenging' nature (the pounding, broken, distorted beats and unrecognisable bass textures of "I Hear Blonde Falcons" being a case in point), and it is clear that the band at this stage were often concerned with creating original audio 'objects' that have questionable worth outside of pure abstract appreciation; other tracks from this time more clearly reference rock'n'roll's more simple appeal, and the balancing of these two ethics across a record creates a unique and unsettling audio and emotional experience.

Throughout Magnétophone's recorded output, the listener will hear sonic experimentation in the form of mis-firing beats, sliding time frames, processed acoustic field recordings, minute background 'happenings' and synthesis manipulation and these are generally presented in 'alternative' song structures. However, their most recent LP The Man Who Ate The Man exhibits the sonic exploration of their early work, whilst also employing traditional acoustic instruments including guitar, drums and melodica, Anglo-folk vocal lines and song structures approaching the 'conventional'.

"Whichever way a Magnétophone track is leaning in terms of its 'influence' or 'style', there is a tangible thread of intelligent and careful boundary-searching and maverick but conscientious sound construction through it; and always towards the end of creating a slightly uncomfortable environment for a "proper" song to play out in. Somehow, like Francis Bacon's 'snail trail of human presence' being evident in a painting, Magnétophone's music quietly announces that they have attended there, whilst suggesting it was perhaps other people."(source: MySpace.com)

== Artwork ==
The band state, "we want our sleeves to be equally as exciting as the music they represent", and to this end, they have presented their music in a variety of quality art 'packages'. The very first single, "You Should Write Music", consisted of a red audiophile-weight vinyl 7", with a matching textured sleeve and a single white sticker, containing the band name and track titles. Their work with V23's design-icon Vaughan Oliver and photographer/designer Chris Bigg has produced some unique sleeves, from the three-quarter cut-sleeved, double vinyl LP of "I Guess Sometimes...", to the laser-cut aluminium turntable pillar-disc that accompanied the CD version of the same LP, to the high-quality cardboard, gate-folding digipack of The Man Who Ate The Man, which contained eight small double-sided cards, printed with domestic interior images and cryptic phrases.

== Discography ==
Albums

- (2000) I Guess Sometimes I Need to Be Reminded of How Much You Love Me (4AD)
- (2005) The Man Who Ate the Man (4AD)
- (2006) Promo Phone 1 (Ensnare)

Singles, EPs, and various

- "You Should Write Music" (1998, 7" single, Earworm)
- "Air Methods" (1998, 7" single, Static Caravan)
- "Box Flow" (1999, 'Infrasonic Waves' compilation, 7", Ochre)
- "Lights in the Eye" (1999, 7" single, Active Suspension)
- "Temporary Lid" EP (1999, 12" EP, Static Caravan)
- "The Science Must Continue" (as Tape Recorder, 1999, 12" comp, Earworm)
- "Lubeecha" – Lathe Cut (2000, 7" single, Earworm)
- "Eve Transmission" (2000, 'Interface' compilation, CD, Spaceage Recordings)
- "Little Boy's Acorn" (2000, '4WD Motion' compilation, CD, 4AD)
- "Come on the 'Phone" EP (2000, 12" and CD EP, 4AD)
- "Relax, It's the End of Electronica" (2002, 7" single, Static Caravan)
- "I Hear Blonde Falcons" (2002, '10p 1 Play' compilation CD, Robots and Electronic Brains Magazine)
- "Kel's Vintage Thought" (2004, 12" EP, 4AD)
- "...And May Your Last Words Be a Chance to Make Things Better" (2005, 7" single, 4AD)
- "...And May Your Last Words Be a Chance to Make Things Better" (2006, CD compilation, Sunday Best)
- "Systems Thinking Business Modelling Consultant" (2006 compilation, Magazine/CD, Esopus Magazine (Spring))
- "22 Calibre Family" (2006 compilation, 'A Mind Expansion Compilation', CD, Mind Expansion)
- "Much Less Than A Day" (2007, 'Binary Oppositions' CD compilation, Static Caravan)
- "Much Less Than A Day: Edit" (2008, 'Visionaire 53' 12" and CD compilation, Visionaire)
- "The Old Silver In and Out" (2008, 'György Ligeti Tribute', online compilation, Topher)

Remixes of Magnétophone

- "Kel's Vintage Thought – Outhud Remix" (2004, 4AD)
- "MNPLIE4AD – Lost in Edit by JM Lapham" (The Earlies) Remix (2005, 4AD)
- "Benny's Trip – Sonic Boom Remix" (2006, 4AD)

Remixes by Magnétophone

- "Run From Safety" (2007 Octoberman – Run From Safety LP, White Whale)
- "Antiphon" (2004, Charles Atlas Remix compilation, Audraglint)

DJ mixes of Magnétophone

- "Kel's Vintage Thought – Outhud Remix" (2005 Glimmers – DJ Kicks, !K7)

== Radio sessions ==
- BBC Radio 1 John Peel Session, Maida Vale Studio (2000)
- BBC Radio 1 John Peel Session, Live in Birmingham (2000)
- XFM John Kennedy Session, Live in London (2001)
- BBC Radio 3 Mixing It Session, Live in London (2001)
- BBC Radio 1 Rob da Bank Session, Maida Vale Studio (2005)
- BBC Radio 1 Blue Room Session, The Earlies' Studio / Echo Gate Studio (2005)
