= Pull Yourself Together =

Single by Hefner
- Released: 1998
- Genre: indie rock
- Label: Too Pure
- Songwriter: Darren Hayman

Hefner singles chronology
"'The Hefner Soul'" (1998)	"Pull Yourself Together" (1998)	"Love Will Destroy Us in the End" (1998)

"Pull Yourself Together" is a single by the British indie rock band Hefner. Their first for Too Pure, it was released in 1998 on CD single and 7" vinyl record formats.

The single was fairly popular. Although it did not chart, it was the "single of the week" on BBC Radio 1 by Steve Lamacq. It also reached #43 in the John Peel BBC Radio 1 Festive Fifty for 1998.

An alternative version, "Pull Yourself Together (Didgeridoo Version)" appears on The Best of Hefner. The single and its b-sides are also included on Hayman's 2007 reissue of Breaking God's Heart.

== Track listing ==
The single was released in two formats, with the single having the track listing below, while the 7" only contained the first two tracks.

1. "Pull Yourself Together"
2. "Christ"
3. "Smoking Girlfriend"
4. "Wicker Girl"

== Cultural references ==
The title of the single is used by a successful Indiepop night and fanzine based in Manchester.
