= The Fidelity Wars =

Studio album by Hefner
- Released: 12 July 1999
- Genre: Indie rock
- Label: Too Pure

Hefner chronology
Breaking God's Heart (1998)	The Fidelity Wars (1999)	We Love the City (2000)

Professional ratings
Review scores
Source	Rating
AllMusic	4.5/5 stars
Pitchfork	7.3/10

The Fidelity Wars is the second full-length album by British indie rock band Hefner. Recorded in London over a period of twelve days at Roundhouse Studios, it was released in 1999 on Too Pure.

It was the first Hefner album to feature Jack Hayter, and Gina Birch also guests on vocals.

The album peaked at #28 in the UK Independent Albums Chart, and "I Took Her Love for Granted" reached #99 in the UK Singles Chart. In the Independent Singles Chart, they placed at #15 and #25 with "The Hymn for the Cigarettes" and "I Took Her Love for Granted," respectively.

Four songs on the album appeared in John Peel's BBC Radio 1 Festive Fifty for 1999, with "The Hymn for the Cigarettes" at #2, "The Hymn for the Alcohol" #3, "I Stole a Bride" at #22 and "I Took Her Love for Granted" at #35. "The Hymn for the Things We Didn't Do" from The Hefner Heart EP also charted at #49, giving them five overall placements that year.

The Fidelity Wars was reissued on a two disc set with The Hefner Heart EP, b-sdes, and other material, by lead singer Darren Hayman in 2008. It received a 20th anniversary repress in 2018.

== Track listing ==
All songs written by Darren Hayman except where noted.

1. "The Hymn for the Cigarettes"
2. "May God Protect Your Home"
3. "The Hymn for the Alcohol"
4. "I Took Her Love for Granted"
5. "Every Little Gesture"
6. "Weight of the Stars"
7. "I Stole a Bride"
8. "We Were Meant to Be"
9. "Fat Kelly's Teeth"
10. "Don't Flake Out on Me"
11. "I Love Only You"

== Track listing (2008 reissue) ==
CD 1

1. "The Hymn for the Cigarettes"
2. "May God Protect Your Home"
3. "The Hymn for the Alcohol"
4. "I Took Her Love for Granted"
5. "Every Little Gesture"
6. "Weight of the Stars"
7. "I Stole a Bride"
8. "We Were Meant to Be"
9. "Fat Kelly's Teeth"
10. "Don't Flake Out on Me"
11. "I Love Only You"
12. "Grandmother Dies" (b-side)
13. "Lisa and Me" (b-side)
14. "A Belly Full of Babies" (b-side)
15. "Mary Lee" (The Hefner Heart EP)
16. "The Hymn for the Things We Didn't Do" (The Hefner Heart EP)
17. "Karen" (The Hefner Heart EP)
18. "The Heart of Portland" (The Hefner Heart EP)
19. "The Hymn for Thomas Courtney Warner" (The Hefner Heart EP)

CD 2

1. "The Hymn for the Alcohol"(7" version)
2. "My Art College Days Are Over" (b-side)
3. "Don't Flake Out on Me" (4-track)
4. "I Stole a Bride" (4-track)
5. "May God Protect Your Home" (4-track)
6. "A Belly Full of Babies" (4-track)
7. "The Hymn for Thomas Courtney Warner" (4-track)
8. "Blind Girl with Halo" (4-track)
9. "Harlot's Teeth" (4-track)
10. "I Took Her Love for Granted" (4-track)
11. "Karen" (4-track)
12. "The Hymn for the Cigarettes" (rehearsal)
13. "We Were Meant to Be" (rehearsal)
14. "You Need a Mess of Help to Stand Alone" (rehearsal) (Brian Wilson, Jack Rieley)
  - originally recorded by The Beach Boys
15. "I Took Her Love for Granted" (rehearsal)
16. "I Love Only You" (rehearsal)
17. "Kate Cleaver's House" (rehearsal)
18. "Twisting Mary's Arm" (rehearsal)
19. "The Weight of the Stars" (rehearsal)
20. "The Girl from the Coast" (rehearsal)
21. "The Librarian" (rehearsal)

== Personnel ==
Hefner

- Darren Hayman - vocals, guitar
- Antony Harding - drums
- John Morrison - bass guitar
- Jack Hayter - flute, stylophone, pedal steel

Additional personnel

- Neil Yates - trumpet, flugelhorn
- Miti Adhikari - engineer, mixing
- Simon Askew - assistant engineer
- Peter Astor - guitar
- Sean Doherty - assistant engineer
- Martin Slattery - organ, tenor saxophone
- Christopher Andrews - Scratching
- Jeremy Gill - assistant engineer
- Simon Morris - assistant engineer
- Gina Birch - vocals
- Matt Coleman - trombone
