= We Love the City =

Studio album by Hefner
- Released: 17 February 2000
- Genre: Indie rock
- Label: Too Pure
- Producer: Hefner

Hefner chronology
The Fidelity Wars (1999)	We Love the City (2000)	Dead Media (2001)

Alternative cover
- Limited Edition

Professional ratings
Aggregate scores
Source	Rating
Metacritic	72/100
Review scores
Source	Rating
AllMusic	4/5 stars
Pitchfork	5.2/10

We Love the City is the third album by British indie rock band Hefner. It was released by Too Pure.

The album peaked at #92 in the UK Albums Chart and #11 in the Independent Albums Chart. We Love the City had two charting singles with Good Fruit (#50 / #5 Independent) and "The Greedy Ugly People" (#69 / #10 Independent). The singles also placed in John Peel's BBC Radio 1 Festive Fifty for 2000, along with "The Day That Thatcher Dies" and "Painting & Kissing".

The album features vocals on a number of tracks by Amelia Fletcher. This was the first Hefner LP to feature Jack Hayter as a permanent member.

Darren Hayman, lead singer and songwriter, has described We Love the City as his "favourite Hefner record."

The album was reissued in 2009.

== Track listing ==
1. "We Love the City"
2. "The Greedy Ugly People"
3. "Good Fruit"
4. "Painting and Kissing"
5. "Hold Me Closer"
6. "Don't Go"
7. "The Greater London Radio"
8. "As Soon As You're Ready"
9. "She Can't Sleep No More"
10. "The Cure for Evil"
11. "The Day That Thatcher Dies"
12. "Your Head to Your Toes"

The limited edition disc featured a Peel Session with the following songs:

1. "The Greedy Ugly People"
2. "The Cure for Evil"
3. "She Can't Sleep No More"
4. "The Day That Thatcher Dies"

== Track listing (2009 Reissue) ==
CD1

1. "We Love the City"
2. "The Greedy Ugly People"
3. "Good Fruit"
4. "Painting and Kissing"
5. "Hold Me Closer"
6. "Don't Go"
7. "The Greater London Radio"
8. "As Soon As You're Ready"
9. "She Can't Sleep No More"
10. "The Cure for Evil"
11. "The Day That Thatcher Dies"
12. "Your Head to Your Toes"
13. "Jubilee" (B-side)
14. "Blackhorse Road" (B-side)
15. "I Will Make Her Love Me" (B-side)
16. "Seafaring" (B-side)
17. "Christian Girls" (Boxing Version)
18. "We Don't Care What They Say About Us" (B-side)
19. "The Fear" (B-side)
20. "The Greedy Ugly People" (Electric Sound of Joy Remix)

CD2

1. "Lee Remick" (Boxing Version)
2. "The Hymn for the Things We Didn't Do" (Boxing Version)
3. "The Hymn for the Coffee" (Boxing Version)
4. "Seafaring" (Demo)
5. "Painting and Kissing" (Demo)
6. "Your Head to Your Toes" (Demo)
7. "Hold Me Closer" (Demo)
8. "The Cure for Evil" (Demo)
9. "Good Fruit" (Demo)
10. "The Greedy Ugly People" (Demo)
11. "Hymn for the Telephones" (1st Version)
12. "Seafaring" (4-Track Demo)
13. "Lee Remick" (4-Track Demo)
14. "Painting and Kissing" (Rehearsal Demo)
15. "China Crisis" (4-Track Demo)
16. "Good Fruit" (Wisdom of Harry Remix)
17. "The Greedy Ugly People" (Baxendale Remix)
18. "Painting and Kissing" (Rob Lord Remix)
19. "Good Fruit" (Piano Magic Remix)
