= Love Will Destroy Us in the End =

Single by Hefner

from the album Breaking God's Heart
- Released: 1998
- Genre: indie rock
- Label: Too Pure
- Songwriter: Darren Hayman

Hefner singles chronology
"Pull Yourself Together" (1998)	"Love Will Destroy Us in the End" (1998)	"'Breaking God's Heart'" (1998)

"Love Will Destroy Us in the End" is a single by British indie rock band Hefner. It was released by Too Pure in 1998, and was the lead single from their debut album Breaking God's Heart.

The b-side "Goethe's Letter to Vic Chesnutt" was, according to Hefner songwriter Darren Hayman, Mathew Hein of New Bad Things.

== Track listing ==
1. "Love Will Destroy Us in the End"
2. "Destroyed Cowboy Falls"
3. "Blind Girl with Halo"
4. "Goethe's Letter to Vic Chesnutt"
