= Breaking God's Heart =

Studio album by Hefner
- Released: 6 July 1998
- Studios: CaVa, Glasgow
- Genre: Indie rock
- Label: Too Pure

Hefner chronology
Breaking God's Heart (1998)	The Fidelity Wars (1999)

Breaking God's Heart is the debut full-length album by British indie rock band Hefner, and songwriter Darren Hayman. The album was originally released by Too Pure in 1998, a reissue was released by Hayman in September 2007. The album's cover was designed by Hayman and Flirt.

"The Sweetness Lies Within" reached #30 in the UK Independent Singles Chart.

== Critical reception ==
Breaking God's Heart made many "best of the year" lists in various music magazines in both the UK and the United States, but Hayman later said he thought the album was one of the band's worst. For example, it was named the 46th best album of 1998 by NME. In a 2017 retrospective piece, it was named the 25th best Britpop album by Pitchfork Media.

Professional ratings
Review scores
Source	Rating
AllMusic	3/5 stars
Calgary Herald	3.5/5
Drowned in Sound	9/10
The Gazette	7.5/10
NME	8/10
Ottawa Citizen	4.5/5 stars
Pitchfork	7.7/10
Record Collector	4/5 stars
The Times	5/10

== Track listing ==
1. "The Sweetness Lies Within"
2. "The Sad Witch"
3. "A Hymn for the Postal Service"
4. "Love Will Destroy Us in the End"
5. "Librarian"
6. "God Is on My Side"
7. "Another Better Friend"
8. "Love Inside the Stud Farm"
9. "Tactile"
10. "Eloping"

== Track listing (2007 Reissue) ==
CD1

1. "The Sweetness Lies Within"
2. "Sad Witch"
3. "A Hymn for the Postal Service"
4. "Love Will Destroy Us in the End"
5. "Librarian"
6. "God Is on My Side"
7. "Another Better Friend"
8. "Love Inside the Stud Farm"
9. "Tactile"
10. "Eloping"
11. "Pull Yourself Together" (single)
12. "Christ" (b side)
13. "Smoking Girlfriend" (b side)
14. "Wicker Girl" (b side)
15. "Destroyed Cowboy Falls" (b side)
16. "Blind Girl With Halo" (b side)
17. "Goethe's Letter To Vic Chesnutt" (b side)
18. "Hello Kitten" (b side)
19. "Normal Molly" (b side)
20. "The Hymn For Berlin" (b side)

CD2

1. "The Sweetness Lies Within" (out take)
2. "Tactile" (out take)
3. "Flowers" (The Hefner Soul EP)
4. "A Hymn For The Coffee" (The Hefner Soul EP)
5. "Broodmare" (The Hefner Soul EP)
6. "The Girl From The Coast" (The Hefner Soul EP)
7. "More Christian Girls" (The Hefner Soul EP)
8. "A Better Friend" (single)
9. "Christian Girls" (b side)
10. "Lee Remick" (single)
11. "School Girls Knees" (b side)
12. "Oblivious" (song for Galaxie 500 tribute)
13. "Love Inside The Stud Farm" (4 track)
14. "Eloping" (out take)
15. "Goethe's Letter To Vic Chesnutt" (4 track)
16. "A Hymn For The Postal Service" (4 track)
17. "The Sad Witch" (4 track)
18. "The Sweetness Lies Within" (4 track)
19. "Broodmare" (rehearsal)
20. "A Hymn For The Coffee" (rehearsal)
