= Dead Media =

Studio album by Hefner
- Released: 28 November 2001
- Genre: Indie rock
- Label: Too Pure

Hefner chronology
| We Love the City (2000) | Dead Media (2001) |

Professional ratings
Aggregate scores
| Source | Rating |
|---|---|
| Metacritic | 59/100 |
Review scores
| Source | Rating |
| AllMusic | 4.5/5 stars |
| Alternative Press | 3.5/5 stars |
| Blender | 3/5 stars |
| Dotmusic | 1/5 stars |
| Drowned in Sound | 9/10 |
| Pitchfork | 4.2/10 |
| Record Collector | 3/5 stars |
| Stylus | 5.5/10 |
| Under the Radar | 5/10 |

Dead Media is the fourth, and currently final, album by British indie rock band Hefner. It was originally released in 2001 on Too Pure. It peaked at #35 in the UK Independent Albums Chart.

The "Alan Bean" single peaked at #58 in the UK singles chart, and #4 in the Independent Chart. It also reached #31 in the John Peel BBC Radio 1 Festive Fifty for 2001. Released as a split single with Murray the Hump, "Half a Life" reached #45 in the Independent Chart.

A reissue was released on 4 July 2011, which included all the tracks from The Hefner Brain EP, the "Alan Bean" single releases, and the "Trouble Kid" 7" single, among other bonus tracks.

== Track listing ==
1. "Dead Media"
2. "Trouble Kid"
3. "Junk"
4. "When the Angels Play Their Drum Machines"
5. "Union Chapel Day"
6. "China Crisis"
7. "Alan Bean"
8. "Peppermint Taste"
9. "The Mangle"
10. "The King of Summer"
11. "The Nights Are Long"
12. "Treacle"
13. "Half a Life"
14. "Waking Up to You'
15. "Home"

== Track listing (2011 Reissue) ==
CD1

1. "Dead Media"
2. "Trouble Kid"
3. "Junk"
4. "When the Angels Play Their Drum Machines"
5. "Union Chapel Day"
6. "China Crisis"
7. "Alan Bean"
8. "Peppermint Taste"
9. "The Mangle"
10. "The King of Summer"
11. "The Nights Are Long"
12. "Treacle"
13. "Half a Life"
14. "Waking Up to You'
15. "Home"
16. "Horror Show" (B-side to "Alan Bean")
17. "A Better Man" (B-side to "Alan Bean")
18. "Charlie Girl" (B-side to "Alan Bean")
19. "Just Take Care" (B-side to "Alan Bean")

CD2

1. "When The Angels Play Their Drum Machines" (Mothership Mix) (from The Hefner Brain EP)
2. "Dark Hearted Discos" (from The Hefner Brain EP)
3. "The Baggage Reclaim Song" (from The Hefner Brain EP)
4. "Can't Help Losing You" (from The Hefner Brain EP)
5. "All I'll Ever Need" (from The Hefner Brain EP)
6. "Waking Up to You" (Bass Guitar Version)"
7. "Wrong Brain"
8. "Alan Bean" (Club Lek Radio Session)
9. "Junk" (Club Lek Radio Session)
10. "Gabriel in the Airport" (Club Lek Radio Session)
11. "The Pines" (Club Lek Radio Session)
12. "Trouble Kid" (Daniel Miller Remix)
13. "Alan Bean" (Munit Remix) (from the "Alan Bean" 7")
14. "Trouble Kid" (Battersea Remix) (from the "Trouble Kid" 7")
15. "Trouble Kid" (Maproom Remix) (from the "Trouble Kid" 7")
16. "Alan Bean" (Rothko Remix) (from the "Alan Bean" 7")
