= The Sweetness Lies Within =

Single by Hefner

from the album Breaking God's Heart
- Released: 1998
- Genre: Indie rock
- Label: Too Pure
- Songwriter: Darren Hayman

Hefner singles chronology
"The Sweetness Lies Within" (1998)	"The Hefner Heart" (1999)

"The Sweetness Lies Within" is a single from British indie rock band Hefner. The second single from their album Breaking God's Heart, it was released by Too Pure in 1998 on both a compact disc and vinyl record format. It reached reached #30 in the UK Independent Singles Chart.

The b-side "Hello Kitten" become a fan favorite, later being featured on the compilation album Boxing Hefner and The Best of Hefner.

== Track listing ==
The single was released in two formats. The compact disc single contained all four songs, while the 7" single only contained the first two.

1. "The Sweetness Lies Within"
2. "Hello Kitten"
3. "Normal Molly"
4. "A Hymn for Berlin"

== Chart performance ==
Chart (1998)	Peak position
UK Indie (OCC)	30
