= Baxendale =

Baxendale is a surname. Notable people with the surname include:

- Christabel Baxendale (1886–1953?), English violinist and composer
- Ciara Baxendale (born 1995), British actress
- Helen Baxendale (born 1970), English actress
- James Baxendale (footballer, born 1992), English footballer
- James Baxendale (footballer, born pre-1900), English footballer
- Leo Baxendale (1930–2017), British cartoonist
- Paul Baxendale-Walker, English talk show host and former lawyer
- Ray Baxendale (born 1955), New Zealand rugby league player
- Sarah Baxendale (born 1978 or 1979), British actress
- Trevor Baxendale, novelist

== See also ==
- Hadley v Baxendale, lawsuit
