= The Man Who Ate the Man =

Studio album by Magnetophone
- Released: October 24, 2005
- Genre: Electronic / Art rock
- Length: 39:22
- Label: 4AD Records

Magnetophone chronology
I Guess Sometimes I Need to Be Reminded of How Much You Love Me (2000)	The Man Who Ate the Man (2005)

The Man Who Ate the Man is an album by the electronic / art rock band Magnetophone. It was released in 2005 on 4AD Records. Equally inspired by electropop pioneers like Morton Subotnick, contemporary electronic artists like Autechre, and Krautrock, Magnetophone have continued to evolve from their debut I Guess Sometimes I Need to Be Reminded of How Much You Love Me (2000).

The lyrics of The Man Who Ate The Man are more poetic than rock'n'roll inspired, and concern city relationships ("Benny's Insobriety" and "Without Word") or similar, but set against a rural backdrop ("A Sad Ha Ha (Circled My Demise)" and "The Only Witching You'll be Doing"). The themes explore control, loss, reverence, worth, relationship-pacts.

== Track listing ==
1. "Let's Start Something New" – 1:47
2. "Kel's Vintage Thought" – 2:46
3. "A Sad Ha Ha (Circled My Demise)" – 3:45
4. "And May Your Last Words Be a Chance to Make Things Better" – 4:06
5. "The Only Witching You'll Be Doing" – 2:19
6. "Ray and Suzette" – 3:28
7. "Benny's Insobriety" – 3:47
8. "Kodiak" – 3:38
9. "In the Hours After 10" – 2:03
10. "Motion G" – 2:56
11. "Without Word" – 4:45
12. "I've Been Looking Around Me" – 2:09
13. "Let's Start Something Smooth" – 1:53
