= Earworm Records =

- Founded: 1997
- Founder: Dominic Martin
- Genre: Lo-fi, post-rock
- Country of origin: United Kingdom

Earworm Records was a London-based independent record label, with its first release by the band Hood in 1997. Other bands to release music on the label include Yo La Tengo, Electric Sound of Joy, Of Montreal, Stars of the Lid, Windy & Carl, Portal, The Besnard Lakes, Fridge, Appliance, Damon & Naomi and Magnétophone.
