= Second VA-44 (U.S. Navy) =

Military unit (US Navy Attack Squadron)

Attack Squadron 44
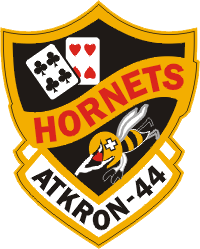
- VA-44 squadron insignia
- Active: 1 September 1950 – 1 May 1970
- Country: United States
- Branch: United States Navy
- Role: Attack aircraft
- Part of: Inactive
- Nickname(s): Hornets
- Engagements: Korean War

Aircraft flown
- Attack: F4U-4/5 Corsair; F2H-2 Banshee; F9F-8/8T Cougar; A4D-1/A-4B/C/E/F/L Skyhawk; TV-2 Shooting Star; T28-B Trojan; A-1E/H Skyraider

VA-44, nicknamed the Hornets, was an Attack Squadron of the US Navy. The squadron was established as Fighter Squadron VF-44 on 1 September 1950, and redesignated VA-44 on 1 January 1956. It was disestablished on 1 May 1970. It was the second squadron to be designated VA-44, the first VA-44 was disestablished on 8 June 1950.

== Operational history ==
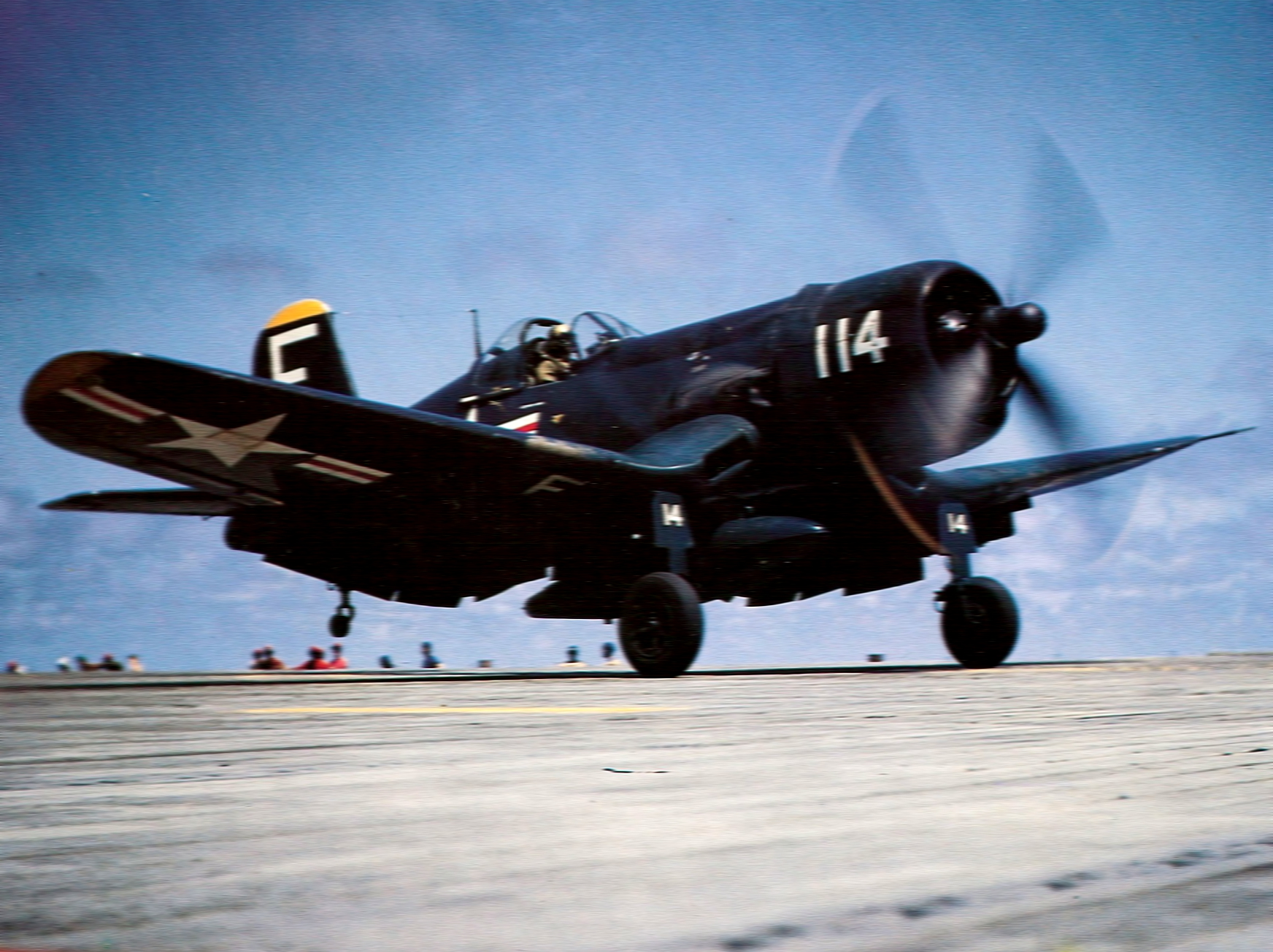
VF-44 F4U-4 prepares to launch from USS Boxer in 1953

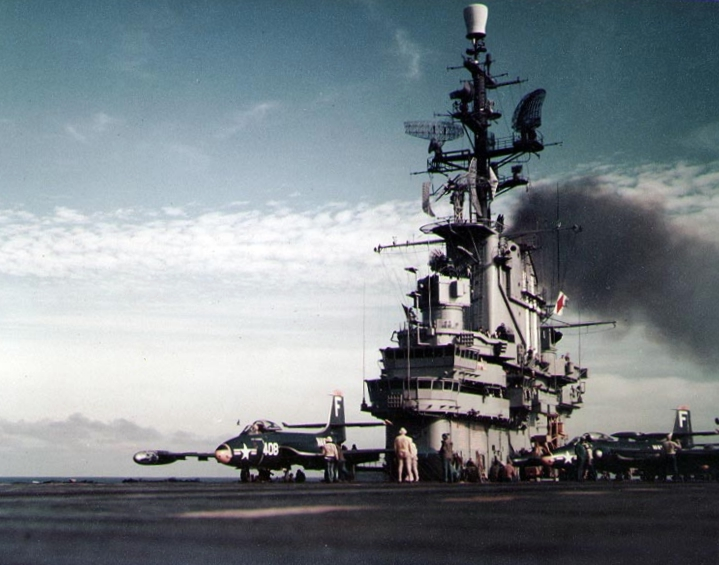
VF-44 F2H-2 prepares to launch from USS Intrepid in 1955

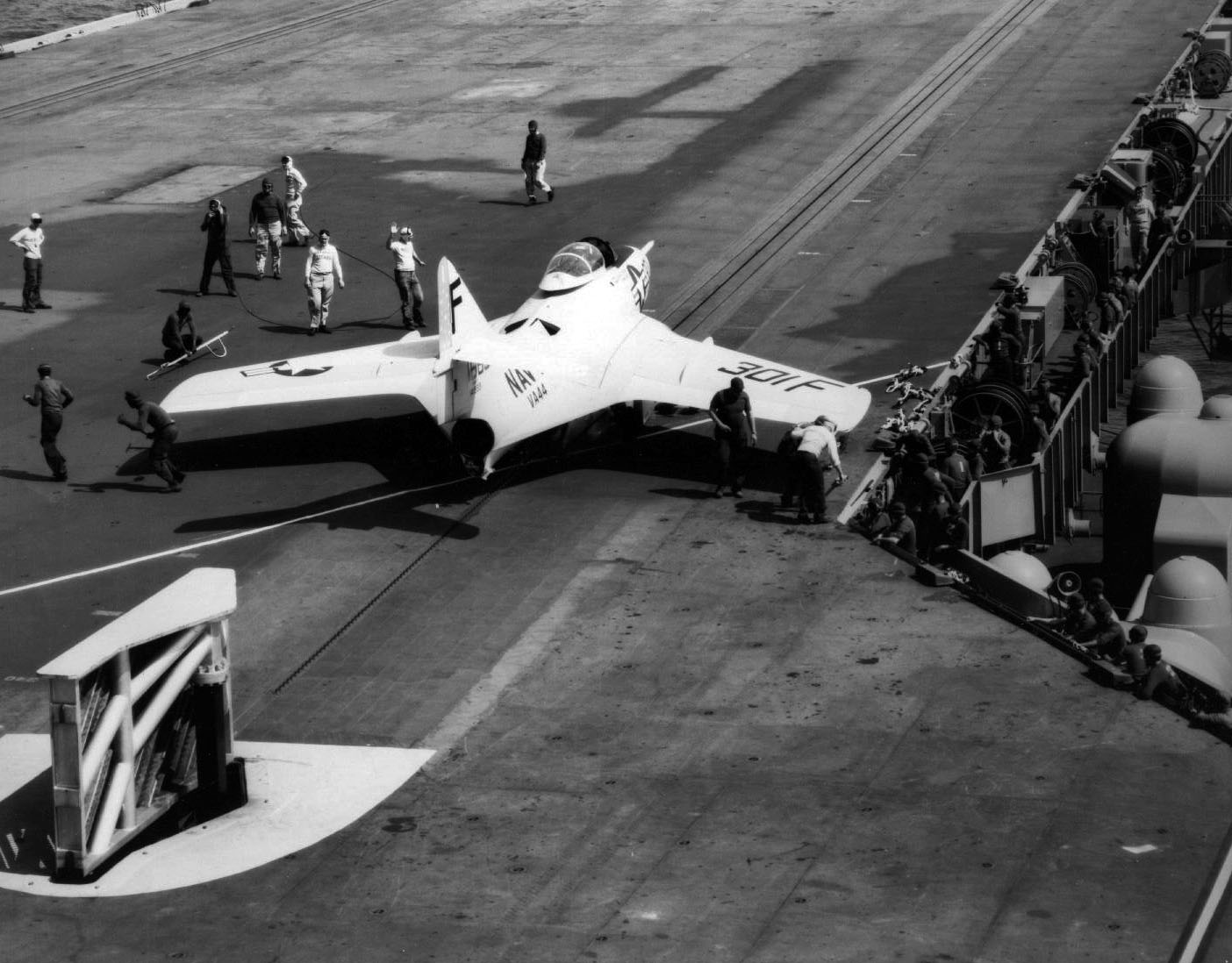
VA-44 F9F-8 prepares to launch from USS Saratoga in 1956

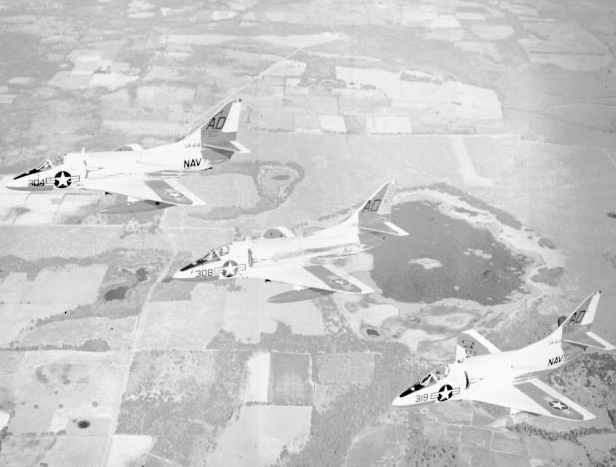
Three VA-44 A-4Bs in flight during the 1960s.

- VF-44 equipped with F4U-4s was assigned to Air Task Group 1 (ATG-1) aboard the USS Boxer for a deployment to Korea and the Western Pacific from 30 March to 28 November 1953. On 13 June 1953 the squadron conducted its first combat operations against targets in Korea.
- September–October 1957: During the squadron's deployment aboard USS Wasp, its mission was temporarily changed from attack to a fighter role in order to provide air protection for the VS squadrons operating from the carrier.
- 1 June 1958: The squadron's mission changed from a light attack squadron to a fleet replacement training squadron. The new mission involved flight training for pilots and maintenance training for enlisted personnel. Under this concept, pilots and enlisted personnel ordered to East Coast fleet A4D squadrons completed the course of instruction provided by VA-44 before reporting to their assigned fleet squadrons.
- 6 June 1958: Fleet All Weather Training Unit Detachment ALFA, an instrument training detachment, was disestablished and its personnel and aircraft were transferred to VA-44.
- 8 August 1958: The squadron graduated its first replacement pilot under the new training program for attack pilots.
- January 1959: The squadron's first AD Skyraiders arrived and preparations began for the additional mission of replacement training for this aircraft, plus the A4D Skyhawk.
- 15 November 1961: The squadron graduated the 1,000th enlisted maintenance trainee on the A4D Skyhawk.
- 15 February 1963: The propeller training section of the squadron was removed from VA-44 and established as a separate squadron and designated VA-45. VA-44 continued in its training mission concentrating on A-4 Skyhawk training. It became a strictly jet squadron flying A-4Bs, A-4Cs and TF-9Js.

== Home port assignments ==
The squadron was assigned to these home ports, effective on the dates shown:

- NAS Jacksonville – 01 Sep 1950
- NAAS Cecil Field – 19 Sep 1950
- NAS Jacksonville – 13 Oct 1952
- NAS Cecil Field – 18 Feb 1963

== Aircraft assignment ==
The squadron first received the following aircraft on the dates shown:

- F4U-5 Corsair – Sep 1950
- F4U-4 Corsair – 01 Dec 1951
- F2H-2 Banshee – Dec 1953
- F9F-8 Cougar – Apr 1956
- F9F-8T Cougar – 23 Jan 1958
- A4D-1 Skyhawk – 04 Feb 1958
- TV-2 Shooting Star – Jun 1958
- T28-B Trojan – Jun 1958
- A4D-2/A-4B Skyhawk – Sep 1958
- A-1E and H Skyraider – Jan 1959
- A4D-2N/A-4C Skyhawk – 09 Feb 1960
- A-4E Skyhawk – Oct 1964
- TA-4F Skyhawk – 03 Aug 1966
- A-4F Skyhawk – Nov 1969
- A-4L Skyhawk – Dec 1969

== See also ==
- Attack aircraft
- List of inactive United States Navy aircraft squadrons
- History of the United States Navy
- List of aircraft carriers
- List of United States Navy aircraft wings
