= Hefner (band) =

British indie rock band

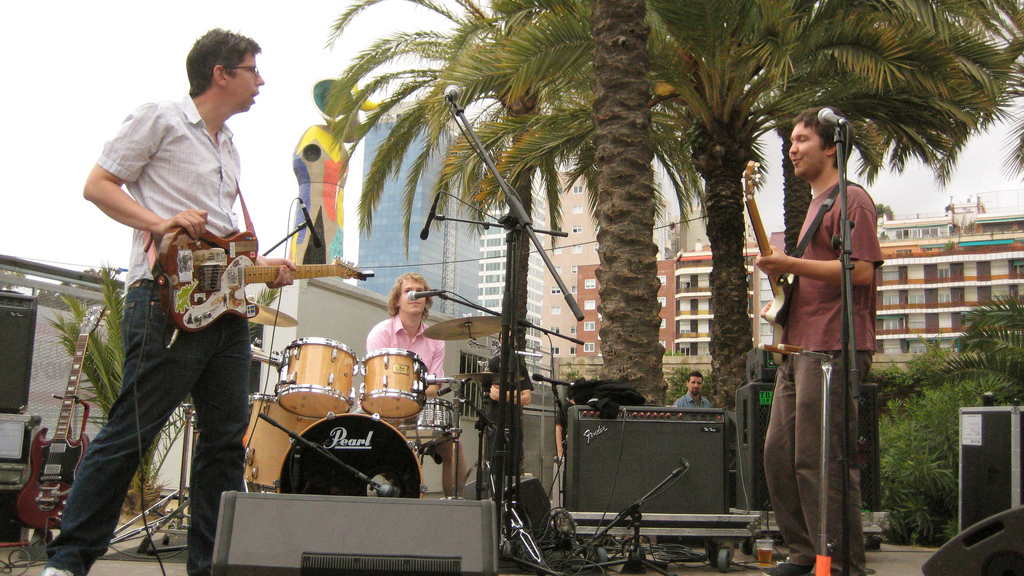
- Darren Hayman (far left) of Hefner

Background information
- Origin: London, England
- Genre: Indie rock
- Years active: 1992–2002
- Label: Too Pure / Beggars Banquet Records
- Past members: Darren Hayman; Antony Harding; John Morrison; Jack Hayter
- Website: www.hefnet.com

Hefner were a British indie rock band formed by Darren Hayman in east London in 1992, and active until 2002. Since then, they have played together only once, for a tribute to the DJ John Peel, who was a supporter of theirs. During their career, they were referred to as "The Peel House Band," and "Britain’s Largest Small Band."

== History ==
=== Solo project and The Devotion Chamber (1992-1996) ===
Hefner's roots stretch back to 1992, initially as a solo project of Darren Hayman, while studying at art school in Kent. Hayman began recording songs on a 4-track recorder, and played some solo Hefner shows in the UK and North America. In 1996, he recorded The Devotion Chamber tape for Sticky Records on which all instruments were played by Hayman himself, with his friend from art school, Antony Harding, assisting in the recording and providing backing vocals.

=== Debut single, trio formation and Too Pure record deal (1997) ===
The band's first release was in April 1997, when the 7-inch single "A Better Friend," was released by Boogle Wonderland. The single featured Harding on drums and John Morrison on bass. Shortly after the release, the record label Too Pure offered a record deal to Darren, who extended the offer to Harding and Morrison.

=== The Hefner Soul EP and debut album (1998) ===
In 1998, the trio released additional singles, including "Pull Yourself Together," which placed at #43 through the John Peel BBC Radio 1 Festive Fifty fan vote, in addition to The Hefner Soul EP. That same year, Hefner recorded their debut album, Breaking God's Heart, which was released 6 July 1998.

The album's second single, "The Sweetness Lies Within," reached #30 in the UK Independent Singles Chart. In September, the band recorded their first Peel Session.

Though Hayman considers it to be one of Hefner's weakest records, NME named this debut as the 46th best album of the year in 1998, and in a 2017 list, Pitchfork Media, ranked it as the 25th best Britpop album.

=== The Hefner Heart EP and The Fidelity Wars (1999) ===
Hefner began 1999 with the Hefner Gospel Session (released the following year as Revelations!) for John Peel in January, before releasing The Hefner Heart EP in February. Hefner issued their second album,The Fidelity Wars (with the recent addition of multi-instrumentalist Jack Hayter) on 12 July 1999.

The album peaked at #28 in the UK Independent Albums Chart, and "I Took Her Love for Granted" reached #99 in the UK Singles Chart. In the Independent Singles Chart, they placed at #15 and #25 with "The Hymn for the Cigarettes" and "I Took Her Love for Granted," respectively. Four songs from the album placed with in the Festive Fifty, which "The Hymn for the Cigarettes" being the peak at #2, and due to the inclusion of "The Hymn for the Things We Didn't Do" from The Hefner Heart also charting at #49, Hefner held five overall entries that year.

In 2018, BrooklynVegan said The Fidelity Wars was "easily their best album."

=== Boxing Hefner and We Love the City (2000) ===
On 7 January 2000, Hefner recorded the first of five Peel Sessions that the band would record that year.

By 2000, Hefner had recorded a number of EPs and non-album singles, some of which were compiled alongside unreleased material on Boxing Hefner, which was released 10 April by Beggars Banquet Records. Hayman explained the decision was motivated by needing more money in order to bring Hayter onboard as a full-time member. The compilation peaked at #30 in the independent albums chart.

Now officially a four-piece, We Love the City marked a change in direction for the band, due to bigger production value, more varied instrumentation, and vocals from Amelia Fletcher. It received generally favourable reviews, and was Hefner's most successful album chart-wise, placing at #92 in the UK Albums Chart and #11 in the independent chart. We Love the City also had two charting singles with "Good Fruit" and "The Greedy Ugly People." Additionally, the two singles placed in the Festive Fifty, along with "The Day That Thatcher Dies" and "Painting & Kissing."

=== Dead Media, The Hefner Brain and Hiatus (2001-present) ===
After recording two Peel Sessions in September and November, Hefner's fourth and final album, Dead Media, released 28 November 2001, saw Hefner experiment with a more electronic sound, which received mixed reviews.

The album would peak at #35 in the independent chart, while the "Alan Bean" single reached at #58 in the singles chart, and #4 in the independent chart. "Half a Life," which was released as a split single with Murray the Hump, peaked at #45 in the independent chart. "Alan Bean" also placed at #31 in the Festive Fifty, their lone entry that year.

After the band's gig at the ICA in London on 10 December 2001, and the release of an EP called The Hefner Brain the following March, the band went on a seemingly permanent hiatus, save for one reformation for the "Keeping It Peel" tribute show, marking the death of John Peel.

In 2026, Hayman reflected "I don't think electronic music was looked down upon at all, but I think it was maybe not as popular with my fan base as I thought it might be. Our popularity definitely dropped when that record came out. And still to this day, when I make an electronic record, I have to expect a smaller reaction."

In 2003, Hayman was quoted in Time Magazine as saying "I don't like to say we split up, It's just that four or five albums is enough, unless there's something really new to do."

== Post-Hefner ==
Hayman and Morrison continued to work together as The French, continuing with the electronic sound heard on Hefner's final album and EP. They released one album and two EPs via Too Pure, and recorded two Maida Vale sessions before a legal issue with the label. In 2005, the rights to all of the Too Pure recordings were reverted to Hayman, and he began his solo career while reissuing the Hefner catalogue.

'The Best of Hefner' was released in 2006, as well as two live albums, and Catfight, a collection of 43 unreleased songs, which received four stars in The Guardian. The band's four studio albums have also been reissued as 2-disc sets, which include band's EPs, b-sides, remixes, non-album singles, and other material.

In 2022, the Precious Recordings of London label began issuing Hefner's BBC sessions on vinyl.

Hayman has had a prolific solo career since Hefner and The French, working with numerous lineups, collaborators and labels. Hayter has released solo material via Absolutely Kosher, Audio Antihero and Gare du Nord. Harding has released several EPs and albums as ANT, as well as under his own name.

In June 2008, Hayman and Hayter, backed by and The Wave Pictures played Hefner songs at a number of dates in the UK and Spain, including performances at End of the Road Festival and Estrella Damm Primavera Club. Members of Hefner have also collaborated with one another on recordings since, but Hayman has expressed a disinterest in reforming Hefner. In interviews, he has said "They were the best band that I've played with, I miss that, I miss John's talent at arranging especially. There's more to it than it 'looking bad' but I think the four of us think as one on this issue. Hefner are not the type of band to reform. You wouldn't like it if we did. You'd like Hefner less, trust me," and has stated it never happen without the original line up.

== Band members ==
- Darren Hayman (vocals, guitar, keyboards)
- Antony Harding (drums, backing vocals)
- John Morrison (bass guitar)
- Jack Hayter (guitar, pedal steel guitar, keyboards, fiddle, theremin, vocals)

== Spin offs and solo projects ==
- Darren Hayman
- The French, an electronic duo composed of Darren Hayman and John Morrison
- Jack Hayter
- ANT, solo project of Antony Harding
- Hayman, Watkins, Trout & Lee, a bluegrass project featuring Darren Hayman
- The Stereo Morphonium, an electronic duo composed of Darren Hayman and Joel Neumatic
- Lonely Boy, featuring Antony Harding singing the poetry of Norwegian poet Eivind Kirkeby
- Rhatigan, a band from Suzanne Rhatigan that John Morrison, Antony Harding and Jack Hayter particapted in
- Darren Hayman & the Secondary Modern
- Darren Hayman & the Long Parliament
- Darren Hayman & the Short Parliament
- Papernut Cambridge, featuring Darren Hayman and Jack Hayter
- The Hayman Kupa Band, a band formed with Darren Hayman and Emma Kupa
- New Starts, an indie rock band with Darren Hayman
- Brute Love, an electronic duo composed of Darren Hayman and Emma Winston

== Discography ==
=== Studio albums ===
- Breaking God's Heart - Too Pure - 1998
- The Fidelity Wars - Too Pure - 1999 (#165)
- We Love the City - Too Pure - 2000 (#92)
- Dead Media - Too Pure - 2001 (#178)

=== Compilations and live albums ===
- Boxing Hefner - Beggars Banquet Records - 2000 (#144)
- Kick, Snare, Hats, Ride - self-released - 2002
- The Best of Hefner - Fortune and Glory Records - 2006
- Catfight - self-released - 2006
- Maida Vale - Belka - 2006

=== EPs ===
- The Devotion Chamber - Sticky Records - 1996
- The Hefner Soul - Too Pure - 1998
- The Hefner Heart - Acuarela Discos - 1999
- Orphan Songs - Everlasting Records - 1999
- Revelations - Too Pure - 1999
- The Hefner Brain - Too Pure - 2002 (#21 §)

§ - Budget Album Chart

=== Singles ===
- "A Better Friend" - Boogle Wonderland - 1997 (7-inch only)
- "Lee Remick" - Boogle Wonderland - 1998 (7-inch only)
- "Pull Yourself Together" - Too Pure - 1998
- "Love Will Destroy Us in the End" - Too Pure - 1998
- "The Sweetness Lies Within" - Too Pure - 1998 (#171)
- "The Hymn for the Alcohol" - Sticky Records - 1999 (7-inch only)
- "The Hymn for the Cigarettes" - Too Pure - 1999 (#87)
- "I Took Her Love for Granted" - Too Pure - 1999 (#99)
- "Christian Girls" - Too Pure - 2000 (#76)
- "Good Fruit" - Too Pure - 2000 (UK No. 50)
- "The Greedy Ugly People" - Too Pure - 2000 (UK No. 64)
- "Half a Life" - Too Pure - 2001 (split 7-inch with Murry the Hump) (#152)
- "Alan Bean" - Too Pure - 2001 (UK No. 58)
- "Trouble Kid" - Too Pure - 2001
