= Quique (album) =

Studio album by Seefeel
- Released: 18 October 1993
- Recorded: July 1993
- Genres: Electronic; ambient techno; post‑rock; shoegaze
- Length: 63:23
- Label: Too Pure
- Producer: Seefeel

Seefeel chronology
| More Like Space EP (1993) | Quique (1993) | Starethrough (1994) |

Quique (/kiːk/) is the debut album by the British music group Seefeel. It was released through Too Pure in October 1993. A predominantly instrumental record which utilises elements of both rock and electronic music, it blends styles including techno, dream pop, ambient, and dub. Guitarist Mark Clifford worked continually on tracks while other members either completed them or provided component ideas.

The album was met with positive reviews from critics, and reached No. 12 in the UK Independent Albums Chart. It was followed by the EP Starethrough on Warp in 1994. Quique was re-released in 2007 in a deluxe format that included unreleased, re-mixed tracks and other music that was only released on compilations. The album continued to receive praise on its re-issue.

== Background and production ==
Mark Clifford formed Seefeel in 1992 after posting advertisements for potential group members. After performing a few shows and recording demos, Seefeel signed to the Too Pure label in late 1992. Too Pure's co-owner Richard Roberts stated that upon hearing Seefeel's demo "there was no obvious song for radio, but in my opinion it felt good. As we viewed ourselves as an experimental label that didn't want to be tied to a sound or a scene, it seemed to make sense to release something with the band." Seefeel chose Too Pure as they felt the label had respect for its artists, despite the low budget given to them to record Quique.

Clifford described the composition of the album as "messing around with a particular sound and then that sound would quite often just evoke a melody. Because the sounds we used were very much based around harmonics and stuff." The songs were completed before recording in the studio and many tracks had been performed live prior to the album's release. The only song written in the recording studio was "Charlotte's Mouth". All the songs on the album were completed in a way that would allow Seefeel to re-create their music in a live setting.

Quique was recorded in July 1993. Daren Seymour has stated that Clifford was "working on a constant basis. The other members of the band contributed either complete tracks or component ideas into the process – some were accepted or not as Mark acted as the editor, and quite rightly so at times!" After the album was mastered, the group had Too Pure remove a track from the album before it was released.

== Music ==
"Shoegaze was one of a number of terms applied to us when Quique was first issued. Shoegaze, dub, IDM, electronica, drone... the list went on."

— Seefeel member Mark Clifford describing genres that critics applied to Quique on its release

The music on Quique is predominantly instrumental. Some tracks include wordless vocals from Seefeel's guitarist and vocalist Sarah Peacock. Peacock's vocals are low in the audio mix and are heard on the tracks "Industrious" and "Charlotte's Mouth". The tone of the album has been described as less dark than the group's follow-up albums Succour and CH-VOX.

The album's unusual blend of genres led critics to apply various different labels to Quique, associating it with styles such as dream pop, ambient techno, dub, intelligent dance music, and shoegaze. Critic Simon Reynolds described the group as "the best" of various dream pop bands who had "turned on to techno." Glenn Swan of AllMusic described the album's mixture of genres as "a sort of electronic hybrid that had listeners simultaneously scratching their heads". Jess Harvell of Pitchfork stated that the audience will "hear the beginnings of a still-thriving genre that remains slippery and unnamed, purely electronic music with a strange, tangy rock aftertaste." In the website's list of the "50 Best Shoegaze Albums of All Time", Mark Richardson of Pitchfork included it in 13th place, locating the music on "the oceanic end of shoegaze." Paste writer Robert Ham classified the album as a post-rock album in 2016, as did Simon Reynolds in his 2011 book Bring the Noise. AllMusic's John Bush described it as "an even colder document of ambient indie techno than the previous EPs had predicted," and noted that "[t]he album was hailed -- mostly in rock circles -- as a techno album which indie kids could listen to."

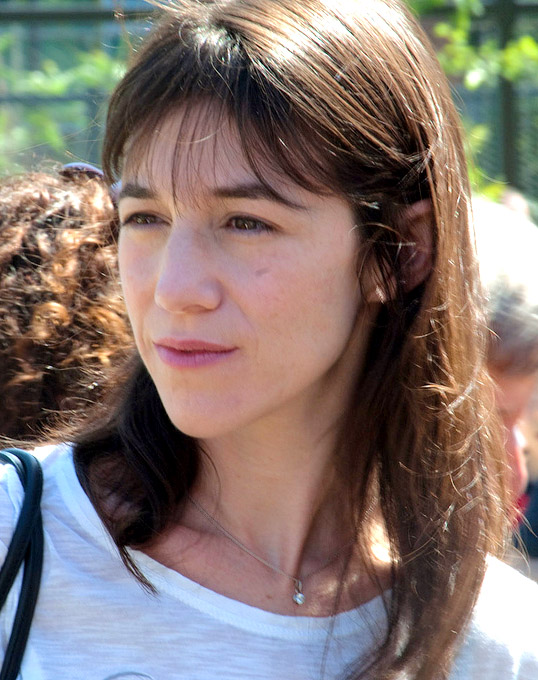
"Charlotte's Mouth" is named after actress and singer Charlotte Gainsbourg.

Clifford was irritated by being placed within a genre by critics, stating that Seefeel "weren't trying to fit into any one of their scenes and it felt a little like we were almost having convention thrust upon us when that was the very thing we were reacting against." Glenn Swan compared the songs to ambient music by Aphex Twin, while Cam Lindsay of Exclaim! noted that "Quique follows a similar path as Aphex Twin's Selected Ambient work but with structures that a more rock-based band like Chapterhouse dreamed of matching." The members of Seefeel were fans of Aphex Twin and said after playing shows with him and Autechre that they felt "more affinity with them than many of the bands we'd met – Robin Guthrie and the Cocteau Twins excepted!"

"Climactic Phase #3" contains minimal percussion, a bass line that rises and falls that creates a faint pulse to guide it. Clifford described "Climactic Phase #3" as "an attempt to see how much juice I could squeeze out of a few repetitive loops." Both "Climactic Phase #3" and "Polyfusion" contain guitar feedback and drum machines. The vocals on "Polyfusion" were described by Sarah Peacock as not having lyrics, but vocalizations invented for their sonic value. Peacock said that she loved the song's "groovy and dubby" feel, but disliked the "pitchy vocals" "Imperial", "Climactic Phase #3" and "Plainsong" were made from what Clifford called "an obsession for sampling and sequencing. Very standard technology now, but at the time the ability to sample and shift and manipulate guitar sounds was fascinating to me." Clifford would later describe "Plainsong" as attempt to put "the vaguest hint of a song into the equation", having had difficulty with the rhythm of the song changing it continuously.

"Industrious" showcases ambiance and drums which anchor the mix. Clifford characterized the song as an audio experiment by processing drum machines through guitar effects. "Charlotte's Mouth", named after Charlotte Gainsbourg, contains guitar, bass and metallic percussion. The song began as a loop of Justin Fletcher's percussion which later had guitar and vocals added. "Through You" is the only Seefeel song to use a keyboard on Quique. Clifford composed it quickly, noting that it was made in "about two hours". "Filter Dub" was described by Clifford as heavily influenced by Jah Wobble. It does not feature a large amount of sampled guitars like other tracks on the album.

When asked how the group felt about Quique in 2013, Clifford said he found that it "holds up okay—some tracks more than others" and that he felt "mostly good about [the songs]" and "looked forward to playing certain tracks live". Peacock spoke positively about the album, saying that since it was their first album, it "will always be the fondest".

== Release ==
Quique was released in October 1993 through the label Too Pure. It entered the UK Independent Albums Chart at No. 12 in the week ending 6 November 1993. The track "Plainsong" had been released earlier on the Plainsong EP in June 1993.

As of 2003, Quique had sold between sixteen and seventeen thousand copies. After the album's release, Seefeel left Too Pure and signed to the more electronic music oriented label Warp. Warp released their next EP Starethrough on 18 April 1994. The label Astralwerks gave Quique a domestic release in the US in April 1994.

In 2007, Quique was re-released in a deluxe edition. This version of the album included a bonus disc containing unreleased tracks, re-mixes and songs that appeared on compilation albums. Quique was re-released on vinyl on 27 August 2013 through Light in the Attic Records and its Modern Classics Recordings series, in conjunction with Medical Records. It was released with a gate fold sleeve with 1000 copies printed on blue vinyl. In November 2018, the group performed the album in full at festivals in Barcelona and Utrecht in celebration of its 25th anniversary, under the heading "Seefeel performing 'Quique'".

In 2025, Quique was re-released again on Too Pure Records. This edition also included the bonus disc.

== Critical reception ==
Professional ratings
Review scores
| Source | Rating |
|---|---|
| AllMusic | 4.5/5 stars |
| Mojo | 4/5 stars |
| NME | 8/10 |
| Pitchfork | 8.4/10 |
| Q | 4/5 stars |
| Record Collector | 5/5 stars |
| The Skinny | 4/5 stars |
| Tiny Mix Tapes | 4.5/5 |
| Uncut | 9/10 |

Simon Reynolds gave Quique a positive review in Spin, stating that Seefeel had "struck a sublime groove midway between [My Bloody Valentine's] sensual tumult and Aphex Twin's ambient serenity." In his review for Melody Maker, Reynolds wrote that the group's songs "sometimes need a bit more space in their sound, a bit of emptiness to punctuate the drone-swarm. Like MBV on Loveless, they're sometimes so blissed it's suffocating, like drowning in mother's milk. But overall, Quique is consummate, a blanched canvas for the imagination, and a cracking album." Roger Morton of NME praised Quique as "an amazingly singleminded work" and credited Seefeel for developing a "completely unique" sound unlike "a lot of their relatives in the post-dance ambient world". Jon Savage was also favourable in Mojo, stating that "throughout much of Quique, Seefeel achieve that spacious weightlessness hinted at by their titles: 'Climactic Phase #3', 'Filter Dub', 'Signals'".

In a review of the group's next album, Succour, Select's Gareth Grundy remarked negatively on Quique, opining that it "owed as much to My Bloody Valentine as Aphex, but never believably cemented the two influences." Louise Gray of The Times commented on Quique in 1994, stating that the album "drew sighs of admiration from critics and the public alike" and was "a beautiful document which has its roots in an experimentalism that began with La Monte Young and has, in recent years, been continued variously by Glenn Branca, the Swans [sic] and Spiritualised. The points of contact with any of the current crop of dance music-makers are minimal." In 1999, CMJ New Music Monthly summarised the British critics' reception to Quique, stating that the album "earned Seefeel several months of adoration in the British music press and the subsequent obscurity that usually follows such kudos."

=== Retrospective reception ===
Later reviews have been positive. Jess Harvell of Pitchfork opined that Quique "still sounds timeless." Glenn Swan of AllMusic praised the album as "Seefeel at their most ornate. They squint by staring into the geometric refractions of light and record the results." Jason Ferguson of Harp described Quique as "shimmered with a futuristic ethereality that was far more substantial than the electro-ambience of the era, but also much less assaultive than the shoegazers Seefeel was affiliated with early on," adding that the 2007 re-issue was "a fitting tribute to a very unique sound." Los Angeles Times writer Chris Barton called it an "underrated" album "that even 20 years later sounds like nothing else." Mark Edwards of The Sunday Times gave the Redux edition a positive review, referring to Quique as the group's "finest moment" and concluding: "If you like music to have structure, Quique will drive you barmy; but if you consider the presence of the word 'texture' in an album review to be a positive, you might well enjoy this languid landmark." Cam Lindsay wrote in Exclaim! that "While it doesn't feel like a timely release, the re-discovery of Seefeel (no word yet on a reunion) certainly verifies their relevance in today's music, especially in light of neo-gazers like Ulrich Schnauss and Tim Hecker." In 1999, critic Ned Raggett ranked the album at number 34 on his list of "The Top 136 or So Albums of the Nineties" for Freaky Trigger. In 2016, Pitchfork placed Quique at number 13 on its list of "The 50 Best Shoegaze Albums of All Time", and Paste included it at number 8 on its list of "The 50 Best Post-Rock Albums".

== Track listing ==
All tracks are written by Mark Clifford, except where otherwise noted

| No. | Title | Writer(s) | Length |
|---|---|---|---|
| 1. | "Climactic Phase #3" | Mark Clifford, Justin Fletcher | 8:24 |
| 2. | "Polyfusion" | Clifford, Sarah Peacock | 6:22 |
| 3. | "Industrious" | Clifford, Peacock | 6:38 |
| 4. | "Imperial" | | 6:37 |
| 5. | "Plainsong" | | 7:40 |
| 6. | "Charlotte's Mouth" | Clifford, Peacock, Daren Seymour, Fletcher | 7:25 |
| 7. | "Through You" | | 5:46 |
| 8. | "Filter Dub" | | 8:45 |
| 9. | "Signals" | Seymour, Clifford | 5:47 |

Redux edition disc 2
| No. | Title | Writer(s) | Length |
|---|---|---|---|
| 10. | "Clique" | Peacock, Clifford, Seymour, Fletcher | 5:28 |
| 11. | "Is It Now?" | Clifford, Seymour | 4:23 |
| 12. | "Filter Dub (i-01 Mix)" | | 9:40 |
| 13. | "Come Alive (Climactic Phase #1)" | Clifford, Peacock, Seymour, Fletcher | 5:41 |
| 14. | "Time to Find Me (Alternate Desk Mix)" | Peacock, Clifford, Seymour, Fletcher | 5:20 |
| 15. | "Charlotte's Mouth (Avant Garde Mix)" | Clifford, Peacock, Seymour, Fletcher | 7:27 |
| 16. | "My Super 20" | Clifford, Seefeel | 6:31 |
| 17. | "Climactic Phase #3 (Overnight Mix)" | Clifford, Fletcher | 8:31 |
| 18. | "Silent Pool" | Clifford, Peacock, Seymour, Fletcher | 7:02 |

== Personnel ==
Credits adapted from Quique Redux edition booklet.

- Mark Clifford – guitar, sequencing, rhythm treatments, engineering
- Sarah Peacock – guitar, vocals
- Daren Seymour – bass, radio
- Justin Fletcher – percussion, rhythm programming
- Seefeel – production, mixing
- Adrian Harrow – engineering
- Mark Van Hoen – engineering, mixing (track 13)

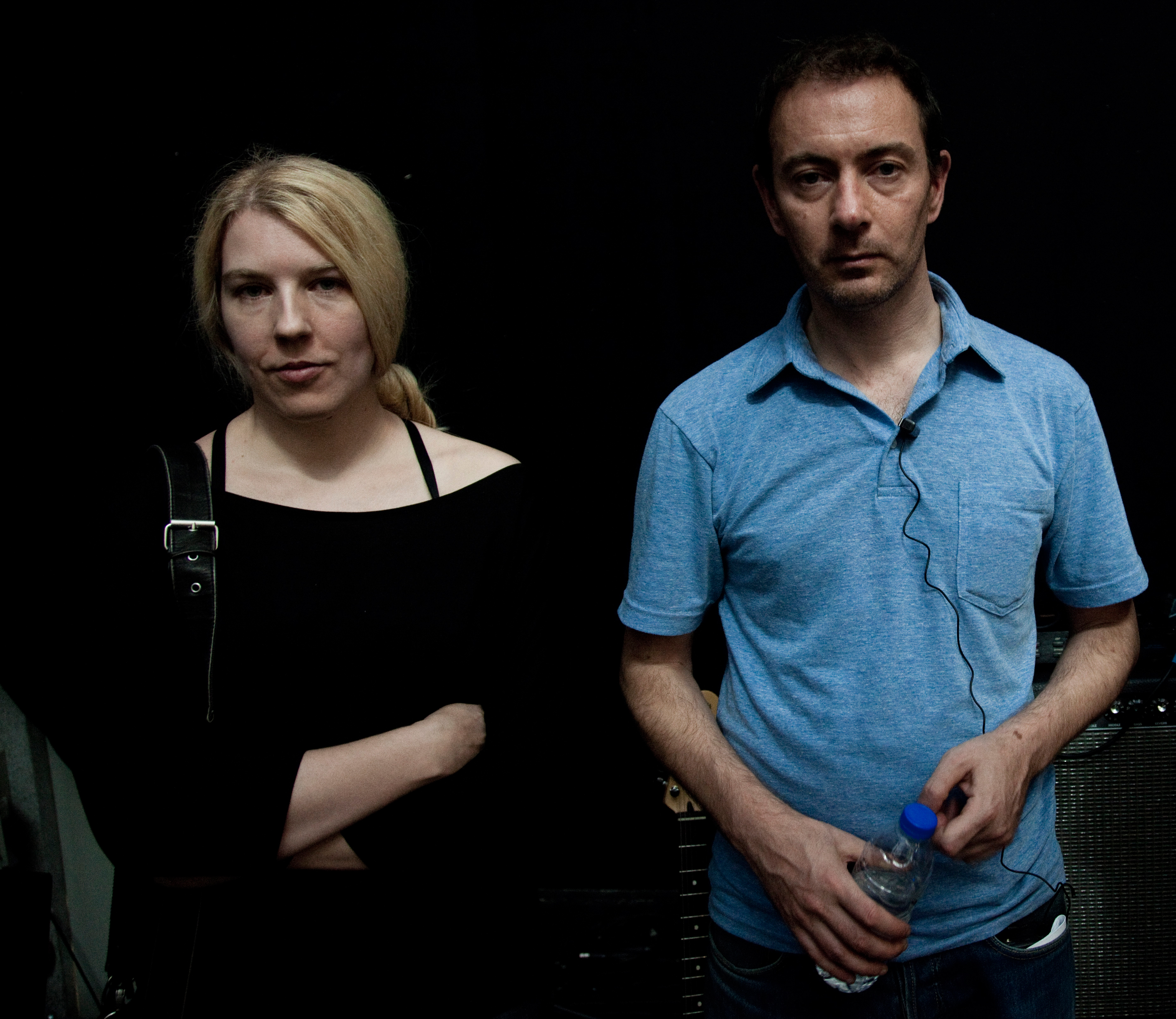
Two original Seefeel members Sarah Peacock and Mark Clifford in 2010.

Credits adapted from Quique 2013 vinyl release

- Troy Wadsworth – re-release producer, re-release executive producer
- Matt Sullivan – re-release producer, re-release executive producer
- Josh Wright – re-release executive producer
- Patrick McCarthy – project coordinator
- Dave Segal – liner notes
- Tyler Jacobsen – re-release design

== See also ==
- 1993 in British music
- Music of the United Kingdom (1990s)
