= Sol.Hz =

2026 studio album by Seefeel

Studio album by Seefeel
- Released: 1 May 2026
- Studio: Polyfusia; Church Road Studios
- Genre: Ambient; ambient techno; dub; electronic; experimental
- Length: 42:06
- Label: Warp
- Producer: Mark Clifford

Seefeel chronology
Squared Roots (2024)	Sol.Hz (2026)

Singles from Sol.Hz
- 1. "Ever No Way" Released: 4 March 2026; 2. "Until Now" Released: 9 April 2026

Sol.Hz is the fifth studio album by British electronic post-rock group Seefeel. The album was released on 1 May 2026 through Warp Records. Comprising ambient, ambient techno, dub, electronic and experimental music, the album focuses primarily on ambient soundscapes and melody with percussive elements coming secondary.

Backed by the release of two singles, "Ever No Way" and "Until Now", the album marked the band's first full-length release in 15 years. Seefeel would tour Europe in accompaniment of the album. Critics and journalists reviewed Sol.Hz extremely positively, describing it as unique, nostalgic and satisfying for listeners.

== Background ==
Seefeel is a British electronic post-rock group, originally formed in 1992 by Mark Clifford, Sarah Peacock, Justin Fletcher and Daren Seymour. The group would release their debut album Quique through Too Pure in 1993. They would later sign to Warp Records in 1994, releasing Succour in 1995. The group were notable, as they were the first guitar-led act to join Warp's roster. The band would take two hiatuses between 1997 and 2010, and 2011 to 2024. With the release of 2024's Everything Squared, the core group instead comprised only Clifford and Peacock.

The album's title is an abbreviated form of "Sun plus electricity"; it was inspired by a caption on a solar photograph that Clifford considered an "apt pun". In an interview with The Wire, Clifford said he viewed Sol.Hz as a "strange compilation [...] of the last four or five years". It was originally inspired by a walk he took in a wood near his home, where the "beautiful and slightly unnerving" nature of his surroundings morphed into an idea of a "darkly atmospheric album inspired by the sounds of woodpeckers and creaking branches and the presence of ancient trees". However, this idea was never fully conceptualised, with tracks being reappropriated and put back into the final version of the album.

== Music ==
As an album, Sol.Hz comprises ambient, ambient techno, dub, electronic and experimental music. The album primarily focuses on ambient soundscapes, melody and "breathy, delicate loops", with percussive elements mostly "restrained" across its runtime. Peacock's vocals are heavily processed and manipulated across the album, acting as "wonderfully ghostly vocal tones" and as an instrument rather than a key "focal point". According to Clifford, the use of bass guitar across Sol.Hz was meant to "[work] against the rhythm, punctuating it more". Minimal use of plug-ins was used during the album's production, though Clifford said he aimed to "really try and push them to find the real endpoints, but not to sound extreme" and "[try] to use them in ways that they don't sound like they're supposed to" when they were used.

The album opens with "Brazen Haze"; the track starts with silence, before "moments of choral intensity and soothing wind noises" take over. As it progresses, melodies start to dissipate as noise intensifies. The track contains no percussion. "Everydays" comprises a "lumbering kick drum", a "hissing shaker" and a "damp squib of guitar feedback"; electronic-based textures are also heard as it progresses. "Ever No Way" is made up of a "glitchy beat" and "twisting synth melodies"; an AllMusic review also noted that there was "something resembling singing hiding deep in the song's layers". "Humidity Switch" is more ambient, with Peacock's vocal melodies are matched alongside "screeching loops and distant thuds", almost reminiscent of a door being knocked.

"Behind the Seen" is a polyrhythmic track which applies "reverb-heavy synth sounds" to a basic beat; it also comprises "loops of woodwinds, otherworldly percussion, and dubbed-out fuzz". "AM Flares" makes use of loops such as Cocteau Twins-esque guitar tones, kick drums and brief soundbites, building to a "gentle peak" before spending nearly three minutes on a "shimmering" outro. "Falling First" opens with "electronic hum and scatters of pitched and glitched vocals" before "throbbing basses", "marching kicks", "meditative loops" take over; a review for The Quietus noted the track as a "grandiose highlight" of the album. "Until Now" makes use of a "slow-moving drum pattern" and dark synth tones, reminiscent of Boards of Canada. Closing track "Scrambler" is the shortest track on the album; it is drumless and eventually fades into what Treble Zine described as "the nighttime chirps of crickets and frogs".

== Release ==
Sol.Hz was announced for release on 4 March 2026, marking Seefeel's first full-length release in 15 years. The first single "Ever No Way" and an accompanying music video were released on the same day. A tour in support of the release of Sol.Hz was also announced, encompassing France, Belgium, Germany, Spain, Finland, Denmark, Norway and the Netherlands. A second single, "Until Now" and its accompanying music video were released on 9 April. The album would be released on 1 May through Warp Records on vinyl, CD and digital platforms; in addition, a Bleep exclusive bundle containing a risograph print and an hour-long mix of Seefeel material from 1994–1996 collated by KMRU known as Rapture to Rupt was also made available.

== Reception ==
Professional ratings
Aggregate scores
Source	Rating
Metacritic	84/100
Review scores
Source	Rating
AllMusic	4.5/5 stars
Pitchfork	8.1/10
PopMatters	7/10

Sol.Hz was received positively by critics. At Metacritic, which aggregates scores from mainstream critics, Sol.Hz has an average score of 84 based on 6 reviews, indicating a score of "universal acclaim".

Writing for AllMusic, Fred Thomas described the "sense of nostalgia" shared across the album, noting the overabundance of ambience and lack of percussion across most tracks. Thomas also said that the uniqueness of Sol.Hz showed how "timeless" Seefeel's older material was. In an article for Electronic Sound Magazine, Mat Smith wrote how Peacock's vocals and Clifford's guitars shared prominence and similar processing across the album, noting that the album's general soundscapes "[felt] like reverential nods in the direction of the unique aural motifs that introduced Seefeel to us in 1993". James Batista of Igloo Magazine called the album's production "clean but never sterile"; while the album "doesn't push boundaries", Batista recognised Sol.Hz as an "album for Seefeel lovers — the people who've been waiting fifteen years for a full-length, the ones who know that Seefeel's time has finally come".

Philip Sherburne of Pitchfork described how "listeners who prize progression won't find much of either here", however Sherburne also noted how Sol.Hz "[felt] more satisfying than the last two records". Writing for PopMatters, Jeremy McDonagh said the album worked as "further thinning of already fragile boundaries", rather than a direct continuation of the band's past work. McDonagh also pointed out the album's "insistence on texture over form". The Quietus writer Finn Cliff Hodges noted the album's use of "decrescendos and silence" to "suck you in and ease you out of the music, whilst simultaneously dousing the listener in welcome dub flavours". Hodges also said that while Seefeel had become a smaller group, they were "still just as capable of producing an album full of ambient dub oomph". In a review for Treble Zine, Adam Blyweiss called Sol.Hz "beautifully unique, somehow formless and structured at the same time as starlings might murmurate".

== Track listing ==
All tracks are written by Mark Clifford and Sarah Peacock.

Sol.Hz track listing
No.	Title	Length
1.	"Brazen Haze"	4:03
2.	"Everydays"	4:29
3.	"Ever No Way"	5:47
4.	"Humidity Switch"	3:35
5.	"Behind the Seen"	4:01
6.	"AM Flares"	6:45
7.	"Falling First"	6:43
8.	"Until Now"	4:33
9.	"Scrambler"	2:10
Total length:		42:06

== Personnel ==
Credits are adapted from the liner notes.

- Sarah Peacock – vocals, writing (tracks 3, 4, 7)
- Mark Clifford – music, production, recording, mixing, writing
- Julian Tardo – engineering
- Geoff Pesche – mastering
- The Designers Republic – design
