= Sarah Peacock (musician) =

English musician

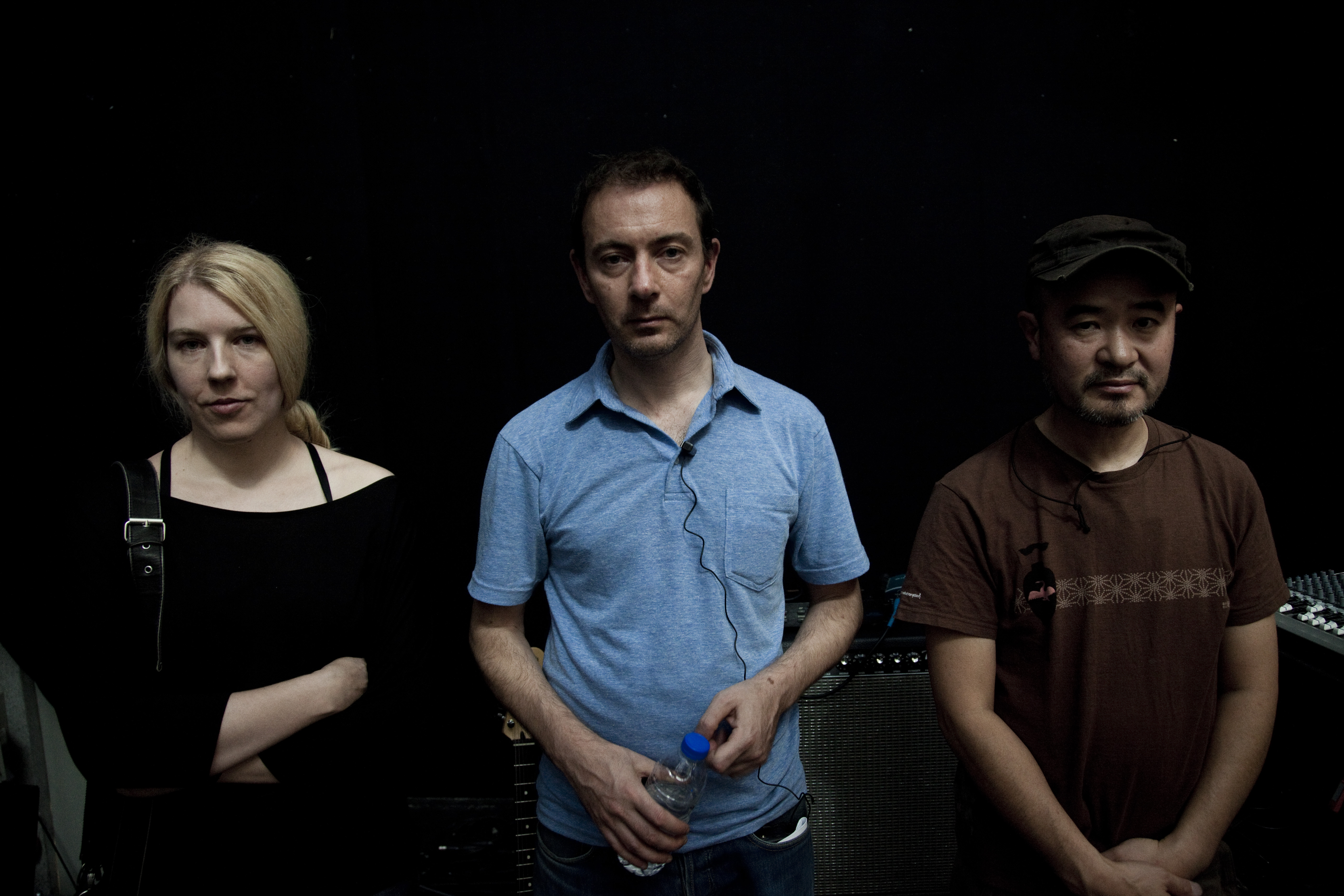
- Members of Seefeel in 2010; from left to right: Sarah Peacock, Mark Clifford and Iida Kazuhisa

Background information
- Origin: London
- Genres: Post-rock, electronica, dream pop, echno, ambient, shoegaze
- Instruments: Guitar, piano, percussion
- Years active: Seefeel: 1992–1996, 2008–present Scala
- Labels: Too Pure, Astralwerks, Warp, Rephlex

Sarah Peacock is a musician based in Southeast London. She is currently in the band Seefeel. Igloo Magazine cited Peacock as "one of the muses of the 90s" era of music.

== Early life ==
Peacock was born in King's Lynn in Norfolk, England, and raised in Basingstoke. As a child, music was always on at home, from the Beatles to Led Zepplin. At age six, Peacock picked up a recorder and began to play. She learned piano and flute as well, with an ear for classical music. At university in Farnham, she got a degree in animation.

== Seefeel ==
As she wrapped up college, Peacock was into bands like My Bloody Valentine, Sonic Youth, the early electronic bands like 808 State, LFO, the Orb and "the Too Pure bands (PJ Harvey, Th’ Faith Healers and Stereolab), Moonshake, Babes in Toyland, Pixies, Lush, Pale Saints, Ride, Blur." In 1991, she placed an ad in NME to gauge interest for a like-minded musician who was into the Cocteau Twins and MBV like she. Mark Clifford contacted her.

When asked how they came up with the band name, Peacock said "Mark named the band from the lyrics of an early demo song (See, feel, touch) and said if I could think of anything better we would change it. I couldn’t, so it stuck."

Originally, Peacock was on bass. The band was soon joined by Justin Fletcher on drums. Peacock told Simon Reynolds that "In the early days, Mark was still singing some songs, like “'Come Alive.' But then gradually I took over supplying the vocals” and Darren Seymour was on bass. Clifford said of Peacock's vocals that "What’s unique about Sarah’s voice is that you can do that–if she sang like a regular singer and you tried pitching it up an octave, it would sound horrendous, like a horrible Pinky and Perky. But because her voice is very tonal, it means you can pitch it up and you get these really beautiful tones. Or pitch it down, like on ‘Ch-Vox,’ where it’s dropped by about two octaves and that’s how you get these really weird drones of vocal.”

Seefeel toured with the Cocteau Twins, and Spiritualized.

The Big Takeover said of their 2026 release Sol.Hz on Warp Records "The relationship between Clifford’s production and Peacock’s voice is particularly compelling here. Her vocal presence operates less as a narrative guide than as an emotional signal, appearing through layers of processing like fragments of communication transmitted across impossible distances. This technique has long been part of Seefeel’s aesthetic, but on ‘Sol.Hz’ it achieves a new level of sophistication" and how "Through the combined artistry of Mark Clifford and Sarah Peacock, Seefeel have created a work that explores the porous boundary between solidity and dissolution, presence and absence, memory and sensation. It is a record that drifts like vapor yet lands with considerable emotional weight, reaffirming Seefeel’s status as one of the most quietly innovative groups of their generation."

== Scala ==
In 1996, coming home from a gig, Fletcher, Seymour, Clifford and Peacock had an argument that almost resulted in Clifford being left on the road. Peacock asked her remaining bandmates "Shall we try and do something without him?’” Clifford went solo and Peacock, along with Fletcher and Seymour in addition to Mark Van Hoen as producer, started the band, Scala, continuing in the vein of ambient pop.

Peacock became the vocalist and songwriter, Fletcher on percussion, and Seymour was on sampling. Scala recorded on Too Pure Records in 1996 and 1998, and on Touch Records in 1997.

== January ==
In 2001, Peacock joined January which band featured Simon McLean on vocals and guitar, Jonny Wood on bass and violin, Jonny Mathers on drums and Peacock on guitar and keyboards. They released two records, 2001's I Heard Myself In You and 2002's Motion Sickness.

== Personal life ==
Peacock has worked at the Scala venue in London since 1999.
