= Succour (album) =

Studio album by Seefeel
- Released: 20 March 1995
- Genre: IDM; post-rock; ambient
- Length: 61:47
- Label: Warp
- Producer: Seefeel

Seefeel chronology
Starethrough (1994)	Succour (1995)	(CH-VOX) (1996)

Succour is the second studio album by British band Seefeel. It was released on 20 March 1995 on Warp and did not receive a release in the United States.

== Background ==
After the release of Quique, Seefeel left Too Pure Records and signed to the more electronic music-oriented Warp, where they released the EP Starethrough and were included on Warp's compilation album Artificial Intelligence II in 1994. Seefeel followed these releases with Succour in 1995.

Philip Sherburne of Pitchfork contrasted Succour with the band's previous album Quique, noting that while Quique contained stylistic traits of shoegaze and ambient dub, Succour appeared to be more influenced by the likes of Aphex Twin. Sherburne cited the drum programming on "Fracture" and "Vex" as coming "straight out of [Aphex Twin's] playbook", while also comparing the beatless tracks "Meol" and "Utreat" to his 1994 album Selected Ambient Works Volume II.

== Release ==
Prior to the album's release, a single for the track "Fracture" was released on 26 September 1994. Succour was released on 25 March 1995 by Warp. It was released on compact disc, cassette and vinyl. The album was met with a lukewarm response and was ultimately not released in the United States, factors which contributed to a temporary breakup of the band in 1996. Mark Clifford focused on his side-project Disjecta while Peacock, Fletcher, and Seymour joined Mark Van Hoen for his group Scala.

Succour (Redux) was released on 14 May 2021, containing 12 previously unreleased tracks including alternate versions of "Meol" and "Rupt".

== Reception ==
Professional ratings
Review scores
Source	Rating
AllMusic	3/5 stars
Mojo	4/5 stars
Select	3/5
Uncut	8/10

AllMusic described Succour as "something of a disappointment" and noted that "the LP was a bit too skeletal for most rock critics or music fans". A review by Glenn Swan for AllMusic opined that "there are a couple rough spots, as [Seefeel] were supposedly having band problems at the time." Succour received a mixed review from Select, whose critic Gareth Grundy felt that while tracks like "Fracture", "Vex", "Meol" and "Succour" are "clearly the product of deeper research" and showcased a distinct musical identity, the band's "voice is not quite their own yet", opining that "awestruck poor relations of μ-Ziq and Aphex's junkyard clang – especially "Cut" – are uncomfortably prominent".

Pitchfork praised Succour in 2017, placing it at number 30 on its list of "The 50 Best IDM Albums of All Time". In its accompanying write-up, critic Philip Sherburne declared it "a singular album that has no equivalent—a sound so elemental, it's no wonder the Designers Republic chose the cover they did." In 2021, Uncut's Piers Martin wrote that Seefeel's music, which he described as "a claustrophobic blend of dub, Cocteau Twins and new-world explorers Aphex Twin and Autechre", "made most sense on Succour".

== Track listing ==
All tracks are written by Mark Clifford except where otherwise noted

No.	Title	Writer(s)	Length
1.	"Meol"		5:51
2.	"Extract"	Clifford, Sarah Peacock	7:28
3.	"When Face Was Face"	Clifford, Justin Fletcher, Peacock	6:03
4.	"Fracture"	Clifford, Fletcher, Peacock, Daren Seymour	5:52
5.	"Gatha"		6:00
6.	"Ruby-Ha"	Clifford, Peacock	6:08
7.	"Rupt"		6:29
8.	"Vex"		4:25
9.	"Cut"	Clifford, Peacock	5:40
10.	"Utreat"		5:08
11.	"Tempean" (The abbreviation for "Tempean" does not appear on the sleeve, only its track number)		2:44

Redux bonus tracks
No.	Title	Length
12.	"As One"	4:45
13.	"As If"	5:54
14.	"As Well"	1:46
15.	"As Track"	4:15
16.	"As Link"	3:12
17.	"As Such"	1:58
18.	"Meol 2"	3:41
19.	"Rupt (Cut Mix)"	5:36
20.	"Fractions 2"	4:37
21.	"Meol 3"	3:05
22.	"Monastic"	6:33
23.	"Burned"	4:28

== Credits ==
Credits adapted from Succour compact disc sleeve.

- Seefeel – producer
- Mark Clifford – mixing, arrangements
- Geoff Pesche – mastering
- Francis Arkwright – digital editing

== See also ==
- 1995 in music
- Music of the United Kingdom (1990s)
