= Seefeel =

British electronic/post-rock band

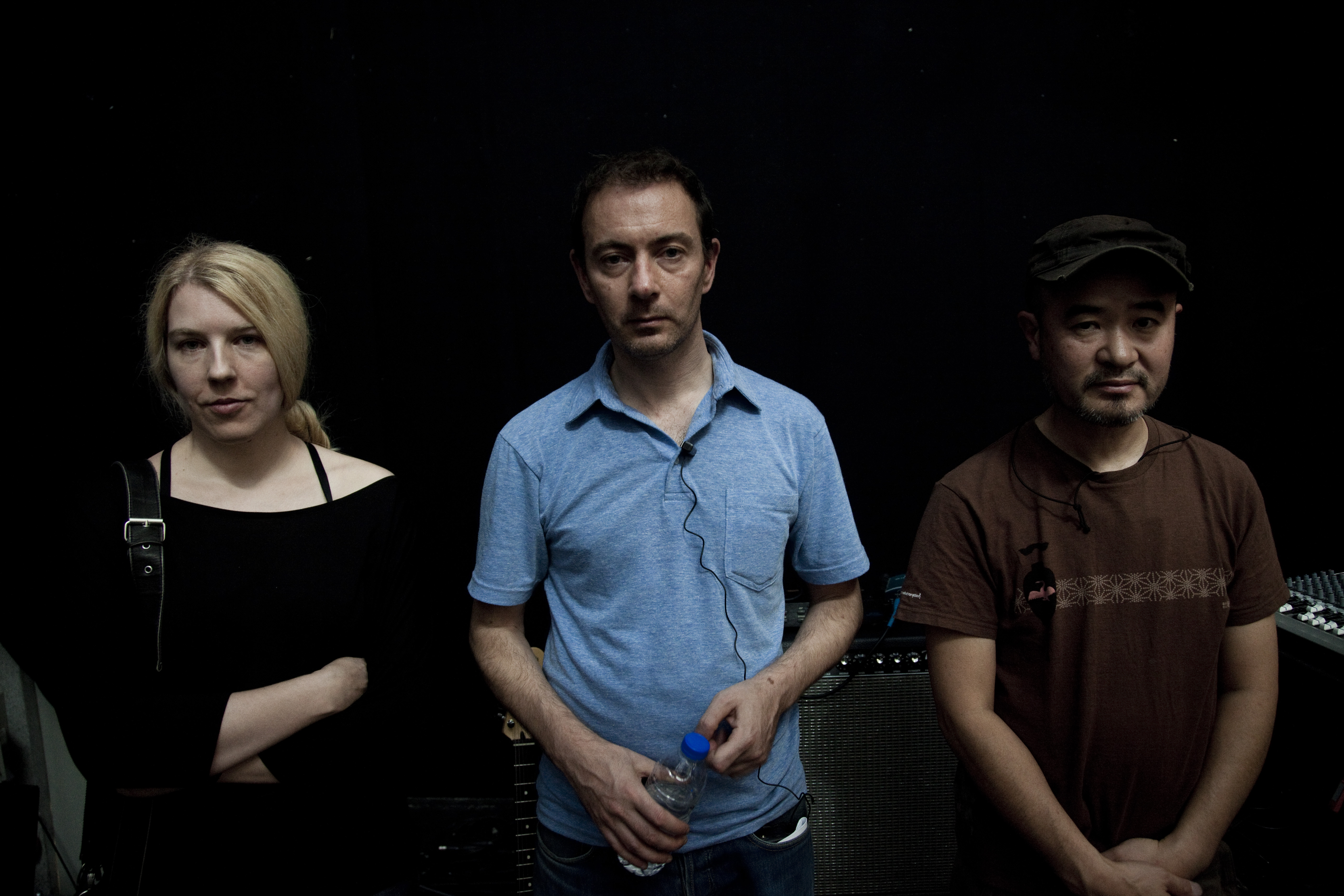
- Members of Seefeel in 2010. From left to right: Sarah Peacock, Mark Clifford and Iida Kazuhisa.

Background information
- Origin: London, England
- Genres: Post-rock; electronica; IDM; dream pop; techno; ambient; shoegaze
- Years active: 1992–1996; 2008–present
- Labels: Too Pure; Astralwerks; Warp; Rephlex
- Members: Mark Clifford; Sarah Peacock; Shigeru Ishihara; Iida Kazuhisa
- Past members: Daren Seymour; Justin Fletcher; Mark Van Hoen
- Website: Seefeel at Warp Records

Seefeel is a British electronic and post-rock band formed in the early 1990s by Mark Clifford (guitar, programming), Daren Seymour (bass), Justin Fletcher (drums, programming), and Sarah Peacock (vocals, guitar). Their work became known for fusing guitar-based shoegaze with the production techniques of ambient techno and electronica.

Initially forming as a more conventional rock band, Seefeel soon embraced electronic production and gained recognition for their 1993 debut EP More Like Space and first album Quique (1993), both on the British independent label Too Pure. The band subsequently released music on electronic labels Warp Records and Rephlex, and then went on an extended hiatus in 1997, with members pursuing the side-projects Scala and Disjecta.

Following the reissue of Quique in 2007, Clifford and Peacock relaunched Seefeel and were joined by Shigeru Ishihara (DJ Scotch Egg) on bass, and former Boredoms drummer Iida Kazuhisa (E-Da). In 2010 they released the Faults EP (their first new recording in 14 years) followed shortly after by an eponymous LP in 2011, both on Warp.

== History ==
=== Early years ===
Clifford originally began writing tracks for what became Seefeel in late 1991. He placed an advert at Goldsmiths College, London where he was a student, and it was answered by Fletcher who joined him on drums. Peacock became part of the group after Clifford answered an advert she had placed in the NME. Soon Darren Seymour joined them on bass. Early recordings were made at home, and other London studios. A demo tape was sent to three record companies and to John Peel at BBC Radio 1. John Peel rang Peacock to say how much he liked the tracks and the band would later perform a session for his Radio 1 show. Soon after, one of the labels that had been sent a demo, Too Pure, approached the band.

=== First releases on Too Pure ===
The band's first release was the self-produced More Like Space EP, released in Autumn 1993. It was largely compiled from four-track home recordings, but enhanced in the studio. Subsequently, the Plainsong EP was released along with an EP of remixes including two remixes of 'Time to Find Me' by Aphex Twin. Notorious for tearing tracks apart when remixing them, Aphex Twin notably left the track much as it was released, asserting in an interview for Lime Lizard magazine, prior to remixing the track "I think it's gonna be a weird kind of a mix because I really, really like their stuff as it is, and what I'm going to do is just add a groove to it. But I'm definitely gonna make it slow. The main reason I like it is that as soon as you turn it off it leaves this big gap, this really big void. Fucking hell, that's well intense, I love it!" These first two EPs, along with the remix EP, were later released in the US as a single CD Polyfusia, by Astralwerks.

The band's first album, Quique, was released in October 1993. Initial recordings for the album were made at home before the band transferred to Falconer Studios in North London, where the recordings were finished and the album mixed. It was mixed and produced by Mark Clifford. On its release, Quique was critically acclaimed, and was one of Melody Maker's 'Albums of the Year'. In his review for the Melody Maker, Simon Reynolds called the album "consummate, a blanched canvas for the imagination". Spin magazine's review stated "Seefeel, have struck a sublime groove midway between MBV's sensual tumult and Aphex Twin's ambient serenity" going on to add "you try to squint your ear in order to bring the music into focus, then give up, and just bask in the gorgeous, amorphous glow".

Quique was re-released in 2007 in redux form, containing alternate versions and material not released at the time. Reviewing this re-issue Pitchfork stated that "Seefeel's music continues to sparkle 14 years later, an entire generation having built an ambient-motorik noise-pop aesthetic around Quique songs like 'Plainsong'" and adding "Quique still sounds timeless".

The band also became a notable live act, receiving many positive reviews in the NME and Melody Maker. In his review in Melody Maker of their show at the Garage, London, just prior to the release of Quique, Simon Reynolds noted their performance was "like an orgasm turned into an environment, a honeycomb space of luminous, globular goo. You feel like you're actually inside the drugged or orgasmic body, a grotto of rushes, tingles, shivers, pangs, spasms" further adding that the band was "a pipe-dream come true, and the best new band of '93". The band toured in Europe with the Cocteau Twins soon after the release of Quique, and Mark Clifford later undertook remix work for the band.

=== Signing to Warp Records ===
Following the success of Quique, Seefeel were approached by Warp Records in early 1994. They subsequently signed to the label and became the first band signed to Warp who used guitars. Steve Beckett, the label's owner said in an interview "Seefeel were the first band that Warp signed who had guitars...they were brave to sign to us because they became the 'older siblings' in the family and took all the flak by breaking the unwritten rules of an (up until then) purely dance label".

The band's first release on the label was the 1994 Starethrough EP. The four tracks emphasised the electronic side of the band more than previous recordings. The EP included the track "Spangle", which was featured on Warp's Artificial Intelligence II compilation and, in 2009, on the Warp20 compilation Chosen, being voted in the all-time Top 20 Warp tracks by the label's fans and being one of the choices of Warp founder Steve Beckett. The single "Fracture" was released soon after, along with a video made by Peacock, the band's first. The video appeared on the DVD WarpVision. Seefeel's first album for Warp, Succour, was released in 1995. Succour incorporated a darker, more abstracted sound than their first album, and while commercially a more difficult record, was nevertheless again well received. Writing in the NME, Sharon O'Connell stated "Succour provides both everything and nothing and is just as much a minefield as a treasure trove. It's beautiful. Be careful". The band played several dates of their own as well as touring alongside Spiritualized. They also recorded a four track session at Maida Vale Studios in London for the John Peel Show on BBC Radio 1. Touring, however, took its strain on the band and they embarked on a self-imposed hiatus which, although designed initially as a break, turned into a long absence.

In 1996, Seefeel released (CH-VOX) on Rephlex. After remixing "Time to Find Me", Richard James and Mark Clifford had become friends. James had asked Clifford and Seefeel to do a record for his Rephlex label and they had agreed. When signing to Warp Records, their contract recognised the promise made to James and following the release of Succour, Rephlex were given tracks recorded during these sessions and after but unreleased. Although intended as an EP, the record is considered by many to be the band's 'third' album. (CH-Vox) reduced percussion to a bare minimum and brought aural tapestries of processed guitar and fragmented sounds to the forefront.

=== Relaunch – 2009 to the present ===
Following the re-issue of their first album Quique in 2007, Clifford and Peacock discussed writing new material. Clifford recalls, "Sarah and I got together to do some interviews and we just talked and decided to exchange a few ideas to see if Seefeel was worth pursuing again". In an interview for Bleep.com, Clifford further explained "I was forced to listen to (Quique) again and also to dig out unreleased recordings and for the first time in a long time I realised that actually we were good. We had something special". Daren Seymour and Justin Fletcher were not able to be a part of the rejuvenated band due to prior commitments and living outside the UK, so Clifford recruited Kazuhisa Iida (ex-Boredoms) and Shigeru Ishihara (DJ Scotch Egg) on drums and bass respectively. They were asked by Warp to play at the label's 20th anniversary show in Paris in 2009 and Steve Beckett was so taken with their performance, he encouraged them to re-sign to Warp and to record new material. They began writing new tracks and eventually decamped to Church Road Studios in Brighton, though material was eventually mixed at home. The first fruits of their sessions was the 2010 Faults EP, followed in 2011 by the self-titled album Seefeel. The recordings showed a grittier side to the band. The Guardian newspaper observed "instruments glitched and phased into near-oblivion, their riffs reborn as weird digital signatures", going on to call the album "A hugely impressive rebirth". Boomkat noted "Seefeel have moved with the times, adjusting their trademark sound with characteristically fractal noise textures from Shigeru and more organic, pounding drums from Boredoms' E-da. There's still a sunkissed bliss running throughout the album, but it's of a more sullied, toxic variety".

In 2024, the band released two mini-albums: Everything Squared and Squared Roots. Official band images currently show them as the core duo of Clifford and Peacock. In 2025, Too Pure released expanded editions of Quique (Redux) and Pure, Impure.

In 2026, the band released their fifth proper studio album, Sol.Hz.

== Related projects ==
Mark Clifford has released music under the name Disjecta. Disjecta was named after a collection of essays by Samuel Beckett and was described as an outlet for his abstract constructivist electronica. Disjecta's music albums include Looking For Snags (1995), Clean Pit and Lid (1996) and True_Love By Normal (2003). Clifford also released music under the name Woodenspoon.

Clifford also formed other collaborative music projects. On meeting vocalist Sophie Hinkley at London's Milk Bar, the two formed the group Sneakster who released the album Pseudo-Nouveau in 1999. Clifford also collaborated with Mira Calix recording material between 1999 and 2004. Their recordings were released as Lost Foundling in 2010. He is currently collaborates with Scott Gordon (Loops Haunt) under the name Oto Hiax and their first self-titled album was released by Editions Mego in 2016.

Drummer Iida Kazuhisa (E-Da) went on to form audio-visual project Adrena Adrena with visual artist Daisy Dickinson in late 2016.

The remaining members of Seefeel, Sarah Peacock, Justin Fletcher, and Daren Seymour collaborated with former Seefeel member Mark van Hoen in their group Scala. Scala's sound was described by AllMusic as "More indebted to noise and trip-hop than the looped sound-wash Seefeel had been known for, the quartet also focused on a somewhat tighter song structure and emphasized Peacock's vocals." Scala released their debut album Beauty Nowhere in 1997 followed by two albums in 1998: To You in Alpha and Compass Heart. After working with Scala, Peacock continued work in the group January.

== Discography ==
=== Studio albums ===
Studio albums
Title	Album details
Quique	Released: 18 October 1993; Label: Too Pure; Format: CD, cassette, LP; UK Albums #65 UK Indie #30 US CMJ #55 SCO #66
Succour	Released: 25 March 1995; Label: Warp; Format: CD, cassette, LP, Music download; UK Indie #36 SCO #76
(CH-VOX)	Released: 11 November 1996; Label: Rephlex; Format: CD; UK Indie #43 UK Dance #28
Seefeel	Released: 31 January 2011; Label: Warp; Format: CD, LP, music download
Sol.Hz	Released: 1 May 2026; Label: Warp; Format: CD, LP, music download; UK Albums #45 UK Indie #15 SCO #88

=== Mini-albums ===
Mini-albums
Title	Album details
Everything Squared	Released: 30 August 2024; Label: Warp; Format: CD, LP, music download; UK Albums #68 UK Indie #26 UK Dance #1
Squared Roots	Released: 4 December 2024; Label: Warp; Format: CD, music download; UK Downloads #62

=== EPs ===
- More Like Space (Too Pure, 1993)
- Plainsong (Too Pure, 1993)
- Pure, Impure (Too Pure, 1993) - UK Dance #1
- Time to Find Me (Too Pure, 1993)
- i-01 (self-released, 1994)
- Starethrough (Warp, 1994) - UK Singles #87
- Faults (Warp, 2010)
- Peel Session TX 27/05/94 (Warp, 2019)
- Reduct (Warp, 2021)

=== Singles ===
- "Fracture" / "Tied" (Warp, 1994) - UK Singles #96

=== Compilations ===
- Polyfusia (Astralwerks, 1994) (US-only compilation of UK EPs More Like Space and Pure, Impure)
- Rupt & Flex (Warp, 2021) - UK Albums #66 UK Indie #19 SCO #61
