= One on One (Mira Calix album) =

Studio album by Mira Calix
- Released: 6 March 2000
- Studio: Slix
- Genre: IDM
- Length: 55:33
- Label: Warp

Mira Calix chronology
One on One (2000)	Skimskitta (2003)

One on One is the debut studio album by musician Mira Calix. It was released on 6 March 2000 by Warp.

== Critical reception ==
Professional ratings
Review scores
Source	Rating
AllMusic	3/5 stars
The Guardian	3/5 stars
NME	7/10
Pitchfork	8.4/10

Matt LeMay of Pitchfork called One on One "an album of alienation, desolation, emptiness, and uneasiness." In 2017, Pitchfork placed One on One at number 47 on its list of the best IDM albums of all time.

== Track listing ==
No.	Title	Length
1.	"Ms. Meteo (Poolside Mix)" (with Disjecta)	5:20
2.	"Skin with Me"	3:32
3.	"Nostalgia"	1:46
4.	"Sparrow"	6:03
5.	"Three Teas Please"	1:36
6.	"Schmyk"	7:06
7.	"Ithanga"	1:22
8.	"Routine (The Dancing Bear)"	4:08
9.	"The More You Do the More You Do"	2:41
10.	"Isabella"	5:11
11.	"Daydreaming at Night"	0:51
12.	"Simple Friends"	5:13
13.	"Battery Beach"	1:53
14.	"Upiyano"	3:45
15.	"Afrique du mal"	1:38
16.	"Slip Sliding"	3:28
Total length:		55:33
