= Lido (Th' Faith Healers album) =

Studio album by th' Faith Healers
- Released: 1992
- Genre: Alternative rock
- Label: Too Pure; Elektra
- Producer: Ott & Robs

Th' Faith Healers chronology
In Love EP (1991)	Lido (1992)	L (1993)

Lido is the debut album by the English band th' Faith Healers, released in 1992. The band promoted the album in the United States by touring with the Dentists.

== Production ==
Recorded in London, the album was produced by Ott & Robs and mixed by the band. The American release includes two additional tracks, "Reptile Smile" and "Moona-ina-Joona". "Mother Sky" is a cover of the Can song. Although often lumped with "shoegaze" bands of the early 1990s, th' Faith Healers paid particular attention to the groove and rhythm of Lido's songs.

== Critical reception ==
Professional ratings
Review scores
Source	Rating
AllMusic	4/5 stars
Chicago Tribune	3/4 stars
Robert Christgau	A−
Los Angeles Times	3.5/4 stars
MusicHound Rock: The Essential Album Guide	4/5 stars

Trouser Press wrote that the band cranks "out hypnotic drone rock that crests with cathartic power and recedes." Spin praised the "intense, well-structured blurts of melodic noise." Robert Christgau considered Lido "sheer power-drone, never fully controlled and often breaking into something quite frantic and exciting." The Chicago Tribune stated that "funky bass hooks and lobster-rock riffs on the speedy highlight 'Hippy Hole' spew the punky garage band's attitude."

The New York Times thought that the band "find frenzy, primal release and euphoria in repetition." The New Yorker noted the "swift, jagged guitar work" and "trippy, minimalist vocals." The Washington Post determined that they "recall the edgy intensity of Too Pure labelmate P. J. Harvey, but with a gift for rusty-can grooves approaching the Fall's... It's a potent, and galvanizingly cacophonous, combination." The Los Angeles Times deemed the album "hypnotic and sensual, with Roxanne Stephens' airy vocals serving as the eye of a shifting, swirling storm."

AllMusic wrote that "songs often spring from simple, hypnotic riffs and rhythms which inevitably swerve out of control, screeching with peals of feedback and shooting off sparks—'Hippy Hole' is a white-noise roller coaster, while the taut 'Don't Jones Me' slowly builds from a loping drum beat and a muted guitar line to arrive at a crashing climax."

== Track listing ==
No.	Title	Length
1.	"This Time"
2.	"A Word of Advice"
3.	"Hippy Hole"
4.	"Don't Jones Me"
5.	"Love Song"
6.	"Mother Sky"
7.	"It's Easy Being You"
8.	"Spin 1/2"
