= The Gambler (soundtrack) =

The Gambler (Music from the Motion Picture)

Soundtrack album by various artists
- Released: December 16, 2014
- Recorded: Various times
- Genre: Soundtrack
- Length: 60:31
- Label: Republic
- Compiler: Rupert Wyatt; Theo Green; Clint Bennett

The Gambler (Music from the Motion Picture) is the soundtrack to the 2014 film of the same name, a remake of the eponymous 1974 film. The album consisted of fifteen songs which are used in the film's narrative. It is mostly consisted of pop, rock and electronic dance music from contemporary bands such as M83, St. Paul and the Broken Bones, Easy Star All-Stars and artists including Dinah Washington, Alan Price, Billy Bragg amongst others. The soundtrack was released on December 16, 2014, by Republic Records.

== Background ==
As music had been an important role in Jim's life as a novelist, Rupert Wyatt curated a soundtrack consisted of source music to reflect Jim's attitude about genius, and the sound like how he imagined inside of Jim's head and what it might sound like. He referenced the opening lecture an example, where "Jim sets out his whole agenda and his whole philosophy on life, which is that you’re either a genius or you’re nothing" and the way the soundtrack has been chosen in the sequence, was considered as a great opportunity to "pick the greatest musical artists of our times and previous decades". He called the soundtrack as an eclectic mix of music, with each in turn are "true individual, timeless songs".

== Track listing ==
No.	Title	Artist(s)	Length
1.	"That Glow"	St. Paul and the Broken Bones	2:34
2.	"Don't Think Twice, It's Alright"	Billy Bragg	2:53
3.	"This Bitter Earth"	Dinah Washington	2:26
4.	"Money"	Easy Star All-Stars feat. Dollarman	6:26
5.	"Common People"	Pulp	4:06
6.	"Poor People"	Alan Price	2:10
7.	"Another Wave from You"	M83	1:54
8.	"Time"	Easy Star All-Stars feat. Ranking Joe	6:59
9.	"Sunny"	Ayo	3:15
10.	"Creep"	Scala and Kolacny Brothers	4:52
11.	"Chopin Étude Op. 10, No. 3"	Charles Roland Berry	4:19
12.	"Good Time Man" (Peter Amato Remix)	Discognosis	6:13
13.	"Demon Host"	Timber Timbre	3:36
14.	"Outro"	M83	4:05
15.	"Airwaves"	Ray LaMontagne	4:43
Total length:			60:31

== Reception ==
IndieWire listed it in their "Top 15 Soundtracks of 2014" and further describing it as "Scorsese-esque" which "laced with fatalistic cool and dark irony". Stephanie Merry from The Washington Post, despite reviewing the film negatively, praised its soundtrack having "full of gems". Stephen Benedict Dyson of The Conversation complimented the music as "ethereal".
