= Imaginary Friend =

An imaginary friend is an invented person, animal or character.

Imaginary Friend or Imaginary Friends may also refer to:

== Music ==
- Imaginary Friend (Th' Faith Healers album), 1993
- Imaginary Friends (Freezepop album), 2010
- "Imaginary Friend" (Itzy song), 2024
- "Imaginary Friend" (MØ song), 2018
- "Imaginary Friends", a 2009 song by Zeromancer from Sinners International
- "Imaginary Friends", a 2016 song by Deadmau5 from W:/2016Album/
- "Imaginary Friends", a 2016 song by Tove Lo from Lady Wood
- Los Amigos Invisibles (The Invisible Friends), a Venezuelan band

== Film and television ==
- "Imaginary Friend" (Star Trek: The Next Generation), a 1992 episode of Star Trek: The Next Generation
- "Imaginary Friend" (The Nanny), a 1993 episode of The Nanny
- Imaginary Friend (film), a 2012 Lifetime television movie starring Lacey Chabert
- IF (film), a 2024 live-action animated film written and directed by John Krasinski

== Other uses ==
- Imaginary Friends (play), a 2002 play by Nora Ephron
- Imaginary Friend, a 2006 film starring Abigail Breslin
- Imaginary Friends, a 1967 novel by Alison Lurie
- Imaginary Friend (novel), a 2019 novel by Stephen Chbosky

== See also ==
- Foster's Home for Imaginary Friends, a television series
