= My Secret Heart =

My Secret Heart may refer to:

- My Secret Heart, 2008 composition by Mira Calix
- My Secret Heart: Songs of the Parlour, Stage and Silver Screen, album by Ben Heppner
- "My Secret Heart", song by Kylie Minogue from Enjoy Yourself
