= Edison Woods =

Edison Woods is a mini-orchestra/chamber pop band from Brooklyn, New York. The band was formed in 2000 by singer, pianist, and performance artist Julia Frodahl.

Edison Woods has released three albums. The first album was self-titled. Pitchfork's review of the album focused on its "deft handling" of an EBow, but criticized its "pedestrian stylings", which draws on "influences ranging all the way from Low to Low's side projects". Their second album, "Seven Principles Of Leave No Trace" was rated nº38 in the "Albums Of The Year" list by Spain's Rockdelux Magazine in 2003. This album was produced by Mark Van Hoen, and features Simon Raymonde of the Cocteau Twins. Their third album, "Nest of Machines" was released in 2006 and features several members of Antony & The Johnsons, including arranger/ violinist Maxim Moston and bassist Jeff Langston.

In 2008, Edison Woods began releasing their music exclusively on iTunes, in recognition of contemporary modes of listening. This series is called The Wishbook Singles and continues today.
