= More Like Space =

EP by Seefeel
- Released: 1993
- Length: 23:36
- Label: Too Pure
- Producer: Seefeel

Seefeel chronology
More Like Space (1993)	Quique (1993)

More Like Space is an EP by Seefeel. It was released in 1993 by Too Pure Records. The EP was later included on the compilation album Polyfusia which was released in 1994 by Astralwerks.

== Production ==
The tracks on More Like Space were recorded around the same time as the material for Seefeel's album Quique. Mark Clifford stated that the tracks on More Like Space were simpler while the tracks on Quique were more involved and took longer to create.

The track "Blue Easy Sleep" was described as "essentially instrumental" "Time to Find Me (Come Inside)" features Sarah Peacock's on vocals while "Come Alive" features vocals from Mark Clifford.

== Release ==
More Like Space was released on compact disc by Too Pure Records in 1993. This EP was later combined with the Pure, Impure EP and released by Astralwerks as the compilation album Polyfusia on July 22, 1994.

== Reception ==
Jack Rabid described the title track as having "production [that is] spacious and near-perfect", comparing the title track to My Bloody Valentine's song "Soon" keyboard sample. The review went on to note that "All three B-sides seem like lesser looks at the same formula, though female vocals figure more prominently on the late-'70s P.I.L.-ish "Time to Find Me (Come Inside)," and in this case that's not an improvement, as it distracts from the hypnosis".

== Track listing ==
Credits adapted from More Like Space compact disc sleeve.

No.	Title	Writer(s)	Length
1.	"More Like Space"	Seefeel	8:24
2.	"Time to Find Me (Come Inside)"	Sarah Peacock, Seefeel	5:05
3.	"Come Alive"	Mark Clifford, Seefeel	5:06
4.	"Blue Easy Sleep"	Mark Clifford, Mark Van Hoen	4:41

== Credits ==
Credits adapted from More Like Space compact disc sleeve.

- Seefeel – producer, mixing
- Anthony Brown – engineer
- Locust – additional mixing, engineer
- Matt Nelmes – digital editing
- Jane Brownhill – sleeve photography
