= Stockholm Syndrome (disambiguation) =

Stockholm syndrome is a proposed condition to explain why hostages occasionally develop a psychological bond with their captors.

Stockholm syndrome may also refer to:

== Film and television ==
- Stockholm Syndrome (miniseries), a 2020 Czech television thriller film
- Stockholm Syndrome, a 2016 short documentary by Ami Horowitz
- "The Stockholm Syndrome" (The Big Bang Theory), the series finale of the American sitcom The Big Bang Theory

== Music ==
=== Bands ===
- Stockholm Syndrome (American band), an American rock-music band
- Stockholm Syndrome (Swedish band), a Swedish pop-dance duo

=== Albums ===
- Stockholm Syndrome (Backyard Babies album), 2003
- Stockholm Syndrome (Derek Webb album), 2009
- Stockholm Syndrome (Fishbone album), 2025

=== Songs ===
- "Stockholm Syndrome" (Blink-182 song), 2003
- "Stockholm Syndrome" (Muse song), 2003
- "Stockholm Syndrome", by One Direction from the 2014 album Four
- "Stockholm Syndrome", by Caroline Rose from the 2023 album The Art of Forgetting
- "Stockholm Syndrome", by Greydon Square from the 2010 album The Kardashev Scale
- "Stockholm Syndrome", by Milburn from the 2006 album Well, Well, Well
- "Stockholm Syndrome", by That Handsome Devil from the 2009 EP Enlightenment's For Suckers
- "Stockholm Syndrome", by Yo La Tengo from the 1997 album I Can Hear the Heart Beating as One
- "The Stockholm Syndrome", a 2013 single by CLMD vs. Kish
- "The Stockholm Syndrome", by Mira Calix from the 2007 album Eyes Set Against the Sun
