= Too Pure – The Peel Sessions =

Too Pure - The Peel Sessions

Live album by various
- Released: 1992
- Recorded: March–October 1991
- Genre: Rock
- Label: Strange Fruit Records
- Producer: various

Too Pure – The Peel Sessions is a compilation CD and 10" vinyl LP released by Strange Fruit by arrangement with the indie label Too Pure in 1992, and featuring their three most up-and-coming bands at the time. It contains some of the earliest commercially released work by PJ Harvey.

The sessions on the album were recorded for John Peel's BBC Radio 1 show between March and October 1991.

The 10" vinyl was a limited, numbered edition of 3499 copies. A section of the cover was left white; this was then painted over by hand so that each of the LPs featured a different artwork.

== Track listing ==
- Th' Faith Healers recorded 24 March 1991
1. "Coffee Commercial Couples" (Hopkin)
2. "Bobby Kopper" (Cullinan)
3. "Jesus Freak" (Cullinan)
- Stereolab recorded 30 July 1991
1. "Super-Electric" (Gane/Sadier)
2. "Changer" (Gane/Sadier)
3. "Doubt" (Gane/Sadier)
4. "Difficult Fourth Title" (Gane/Sadier)
- PJ Harvey recorded 29 October 1991
1. "Oh My Lover" (Harvey)
2. "Victory" (Harvey)
3. "Sheela-Na-Gig" (Harvey)
4. "Water" (Harvey)
