= Seely (band) =

American dream pop band

Seely was a dream pop band from Atlanta, Georgia formed in 1994. They released four albums before disbanding in 2000.

== History ==
Seely was founded by two architecture students, Steven Satterfield (vocals, guitar) and Lori Scacco (guitar). The duo eventually added Joy Waters (vocals, bass) and Eric Taylor (drums), and recorded their debut album, Parentha See, for the Atlanta-based Third Eye Records label in 1995. Almost immediately, they signed with the British record label Too Pure, becoming the first American band to do so. Their first release for Too Pure, Julie Only, was a re-recording of their first album, plus two newer tracks, produced by John McEntire (of Tortoise fame). It was received with some critical acclaim, with many reviewers comparing them to Stereolab, My Bloody Valentine, and Pram. They toured internationally, supporting bands like Yo La Tengo, GusGus, and Trans Am, and released both an EP (Soft City) and a third album (Seconds) in 1997, before leaving Too Pure the next year. Their fourth and final album - Winter Birds, released in early 2000 - also got positive reviews, but they disbanded later that same year.

== Post-Seely ==
Steven Satterfield began working with bassist Jim Prible in 2001, and after taking the name Silver Lakes, they released an album in 2006 entitled The Great Pretenders. Eric Taylor played on the album and joined the band on stage for live shows along with Marc Tompkins on guitars and Lindell Todd on keys. Silver Lakes was featured as one of Paste's "4 to Watch" in March 2007. Satterfield is also an accomplished chef. He is co-owner of the Atlanta restaurant Miller-Union (with Neal McCarthy), known for its sustainable practices and use of locally sourced ingredients. In 2013, Satterfield received a nomination and was a semi-finalist for a James Beard Award for Best Chef: Southeast, an award which he then won in 2017.

Lori Scacco went on to work with Scott Herren of Prefuse 73, and in 2004 released her first solo album, Circles, on Eastern Developments, a label co-owned by Herren. Her current work as a composer spans the worlds of art, film, classical dance, and performance. Desire Loop is her latest LP, out in 2018 on Mysteries of the Deep.

Seely reunited for one night only at a benefit show in 2006.

== Discography ==
=== LPs ===
- Parentha See (Third Eye, 1996)
- Julie Only (Too Pure, 1996, re-recording of Parentha See with John McEntire)
- Seconds (Too Pure, 1997)
- Winter Birds (Koch Records, 2000)

=== EPs ===
- Soft City EP (Too Pure, 1997)
