= Imaginary Friend (Th' Faith Healers album) =

Studio album by Th' Faith Healers
- Released: 18 October 1993
- Recorded: 1993
- Genre: Noise rock
- Length: 72:28
- Label: Too Pure
- Producer: Th' Faith Healers; Mark Freegard

Th' Faith Healers chronology
L' (1992)	Imaginary Friend (1993)	Peel Sessions (2005)

Professional ratings
Review scores
Source	Rating
AllMusic	4.5/5 stars
Chicago Tribune	3/4 stars
Christgau's Consumer Guide	(2-star Honorable Mention)
MusicHound Rock: The Essential Album Guide	4/5 stars
Select	4/5

Imaginary Friend is the second and final studio album by English indie rock band Th' Faith Healers, released in 1993 by Too Purein the UK, and Elektra Records in the United States.

== Critical reception ==
In a 1994 profile of Th' Faith Healers in Spin, journalist Jim Greer wrote that Imaginary Friend saw the band refining their groove-oriented noise rock sound and experimenting with more varied musical styles. AllMusic critic Stewart Mason retrospectively characterised it as "darker and less manic" than their 1992 debut album Lido. MusicHound Rock: The Essential Album Guide wrote that "songs stretch to their limits, and the overwhelming tension that the band is able to eke out of such a seemingly simplistic approach is a fascinating achievement." Greil Marcus, in Artforum, wrote: "Using repetition, distance, and the sort of indecipherable echoes that still make Moby Grape's 'Indifference' feel unstable, the group works with negative space, creating it, filling it, then leaving it empty again."

== Track listing ==
All tracks are written by Th' Faith Healers (Tom Cullinan, Joe Dilworth, Ben Hopkin and Roxanne Stephen)

No.	Title	Length
1.	"Sparklingly Chime"	4:52
2.	"Heart Fog"	6:53
3.	"See-Saw"	3:18
4.	"Kevin"	5:39
5.	"The People"	7:12
6.	"Curly Lips"	4:29
7.	"Everything, All at Once Forever / Everything... (Dub Edit)"	40:08
