= Everything Squared =

Studio album by Seefeel
- Released: 30 August 2024
- Genre: IDM, ambient
- Length: 26:23
- Label: Warp

Seefeel chronology
Seefeel (2011)	Everything Squared (2024)	Squared Roots (2024)

Everything Squared is a mini-album by British band Seefeel, released on 30 August 2024 through Warp Records. It reached number one on the UK Dance Albums Chart and received universal acclaim from critics.

== Background ==
Everything Squared is Seefeel's first release of new music since Seefeel (2011). It was mainly composed and performed by Mark Clifford and Sarah Peacock, while Shigeru Ishihara played bass guitar on two tracks.

Another mini-album, titled Squared Roots, was later released in 2024. It contains tracks taken from the same recording sessions that birthed Everything Squared.

== Critical reception ==
Professional ratings
Aggregate scores
Source	Rating
Metacritic	83/100
Review scores
Source	Rating
AllMusic	3.5/5 stars
The Line of Best Fit	9/10
Pitchfork	8.0/10

According to the review aggregator Metacritic, Everything Squared received "universal acclaim" based on a weighted average score of 83 out of 100 from 7 critic scores.

Jesse Dorris of Pitchfork commented that "Seefeel have always used vocals the way other bands used feedback or percussion, and Everything Squared highlight 'Multifolds' shows the wisdom of that choice, even as it indulges in a bit of nostalgia." Ray Honeybourne of The Line of Best Fit stated, "this latest delightful enigmatic compound of sonics demonstrates that the wondrous Seefeel alchemy has not been lost." Andy Kellman of AllMusic called it "nearly as engrossing as anything from the group's past." Tristan Parker of DJ Mag stated, "It's weird and brilliant stuff, as always, quietly demonstrating why Seefeel have always been an important (and underrated) band."

In August 2024, Vogue included the album on its list of the "15 Sadcore Albums to Get You Through the Fall".

=== Accolades ===
Year-end lists for Everything Squared
Publication	List	Rank	Ref.
Pitchfork	The 30 Best Rock Albums of 2024	21	
Pitchfork	The Best Electronic Music of 2024	—	

== Track listing ==
Everything Squared track listing
No.	Title	Writer(s)	Length
1.	"Sky Hooks"	Mark Clifford; Shigeru Ishihara; Sarah Peacock	6:03
2.	"Multifolds"	Clifford; Ishihara; Peacock	5:32
3.	"Lose the Minus"	Clifford	2:03
4.	"Antiskeptic"	Clifford	5:22
5.	"Hooked Paw"	Clifford; Peacock	3:20
6.	"End of Here"	Clifford; Peacock	4:03
Total length:			26:23

== Personnel ==
Credits adapted from liner notes.

- Mark Clifford – instruments, artwork
- Sarah Peacock – vocals
- Shigeru Ishihara – bass guitar (1, 2)
- Stefan Betke – mastering
- The Designers Republic – design

== Charts ==
Chart performance for Everything Squared
Chart (2024)	Peak position
UK Dance Albums (OCC)	1
UK Independent Albums (OCC)	26
