= Steven Satterfield =

- Born: Steven Satterfield
- Occupations: Chef, author, restaurant owner, musician
- Known for: Sustainability and Southern Food
- Spouse: Ben
- Awards: James Beard Foundation Winner: Best Chef, Southeast 2017

Steven Satterfield is an American chef, author, and restaurant owner known for his focus on sustainability and Southern food. He is also a musician and in the 1990s was a member of dream pop band Seely.

== Early life and education ==
Satterfield grew up in Savannah, Georgia, and graduated from Windsor Forest High School. He spent summers in Asheville, North Carolina, with his grandmother who instructed him in cooking, canning, pickling, and biscuit making. In high school, he worked at McDonald's and Baldinos Subs. Satterfield moved to Atlanta in 1987 and studied architecture at Georgia Tech, spending his senior year studying abroad in Paris before graduating in 1992.

== Music career ==
Soon after undergrad, Satterfield shifted to music. In the 1990s, Satterfield co-founded and toured in the dream pop band Seely. Between 1995 and 2000, the band was signed by a London record label, cut 3 full-length albums, toured the U.S., and charted on college radio.

== Culinary Training and Career ==
Satterfield began working between tours at Atlanta restaurants, including EATS on Ponce and Tortillas. As he shifted careers from music to food, Satterfield worked at Georgia restaurants Floataway Café (Chef Anne Quatrano) and Watershed (Chef Scott Peacock), both of which focused on developing strong relationships with local growers, dairies and producers. Satterfield worked under Chef Scott Peacock for nine years. He also joined and helped lead a variety of sustainability-focused food groups, including Slow Food Atlanta, Georgia Organics, and the Southern Foodways Alliance.

In 2009, Satterfield joined with Neal McCarthy to open Miller Union, a farm-to-table restaurant located in a refurbished warehouse on Atlanta's Westside. As chef and co-owner, Satterfield created a seasonal farm-to-table menu, while co-owner McCarthy focused on front-of-house hospitality. In 2017, Satterfield won the James Beard Foundation award as Best Chef: Southeast and Miller Union was a Beard finalist for Outstanding Wine Program. In 2023, Miller Union earned a Michelin Guide service award and was Michelin-recommended for multiple years.

In 2025, Satterfield and McCarthy partnered with sommelier Tim Willard to open Madeira Park, a wine bar located in Atlanta's Poncey-Highland neighborhood.

== Publishing and Media ==
In 2016, Satterfield's published a cookbook called "Root to Leaf: A Southern Chef Cooks Through the Seasons", which was nominated for a Julia Child First Book Award from the International Association of Culinary Professionals as well as a James Beard photography award. In 2023, Satterfield published "Vegetable Revelations: Inspiration for Produce Forward Cooking", his second cookbook, which expands beyond the U.S. south to incorporate vegetables from across the globe.

In 2025, Satterfield starred alongside TV personality and sustainability activist John Gidding in the seven-episode docuseries “chefATL".

== Personal life ==
Satterfield is married to his husband, Ben.
