= Skimskitta =

Studio album by Mira Calix
- Released: 3 March 2003
- Genre: Electronica
- Length: 61:03
- Label: Warp Records

Mira Calix chronology
One on One (2000)	Skimskitta (2003)	Eyes Set Against the Sun (2007)

Professional ratings
Aggregate scores
Source	Rating
Metacritic	70/100
Review scores
Source	Rating
AllMusic	3/5 stars
Pitchfork	7.3/10

Skimskitta is the second studio album by Mira Calix. It was released by Warp Records in 2003.

== Critical reception ==
At Metacritic, which assigns a weighted average score out of 100 to reviews from mainstream critics, Skimskitta received an average score of 70% based on 11 reviews, indicating "generally favorable reviews".

Andy Beta of Pitchfork gave the album a 7.3 out of 10, saying, "Skimskitta isn't particularly strong or potent, but it's relaxed and smooth enough to induce a very mellow, mild buzz."

== Track listing ==
No.	Title	Length
1.	"Again, It Starts"	0:38
2.	"Poussou"	2:45
3.	"Woody"	5:07
4.	"Savanna"	2:26
5.	"The Wolf, the Sheep & the Door"	6:08
6.	"Flicker"	1:00
7.	"Do I Ever?"	1:17
8.	"Sixnot6"	5:47
9.	"Clement"	1:20
10.	"I May Be Over There (But My Heart Is Over Here)"	4:16
11.	"Distracted2"	5:00
12.	"Isibuko"	0:40
13.	"Paarl"	2:02
14.	"Like Spoons"	1:26
15.	"Shadenfreude"	5:47
16.	"Hiccup"	1:04
17.	"Suffix"	1:55
18.	"Simple (Almost Mix)"	0:52
19.	"You Open Always"	4:29
20.	"Little Long Gone"	3:23
21.	"Two Seasons"	3:41
