= Seefeel (album) =

Studio album by Seefeel
- Released: 31 January 2011
- Label: Warp
- Producer: Mark Clifford

Seefeel chronology
(CH-VOX) (1996)	Seefeel (2011)	Everything Squared (2024)

Seefeel is the fourth studio album by the British band Seefeel, released 31 January 2011 on Warp. The album received generally favourable reviews.

== Background ==
The album is Seefeel's first full-length release in 14 years. Along with original members Mark Clifford and Sarah Peacock, the album features the rhythm section of former Boredoms drummer Iida Kazuhisa (aka E~Da) and Shigeru Ishihara (aka DJ Scotch Egg).

== Release ==
Seefeel was released in the United Kingdom on 31 January 2011. It was released on vinyl record, compact disc and digital download.

== Critical reception ==
Professional ratings
Aggregate scores
Source	Rating
AnyDecentMusic?	6.3/10
Metacritic	72/100
Review scores
Source	Rating
AllMusic	4/5 stars
Drowned in Sound	7/10
The Guardian	4/5 stars
The Irish Times	3/5 stars
MSN Music (Expert Witness)	B+
NME	7/10
Pitchfork	5.6/10
Q	3/5 stars
The Skinny	4/5 stars
Uncut	3/5 stars

At Metacritic, which assigns a normalised rating out of 100 to reviews from mainstream critics, the album received an average score of 72 based on 14 reviews, indicating "generally favorable reviews".

Tom Hughes of The Guardian called it "A hugely impressive rebirth" and noted that "it's largely downtempo – live drums and bass provide a roomy, dub-tinged framework for all the emergent noise – but treads a fine line between tension and chaos."

== Track listing ==
All tracks are written by Mark Clifford except where otherwise noted

No.	Title	Writer(s)	Length
1.	"O-On One"		1:03
2.	"Dead Guitars"	Mark Clifford, Sarah Peacock, Shigeru Ishihara	6:25
3.	"Step Up"		1:04
4.	"Faults"		5:45
5.	"Gzaug"	Clifford, Peacock, Ishihara	2:47
6.	"Rip-Run"	Clifford, Ishihara	7:01
7.	"Making"	Clifford, Peacock, Ishihara	5:53
8.	"Step Down"		0:52
9.	"Airless"	Clifford, Peacock, Ishihara	5:41
10.	"Aug30"	Clifford, Ishihara	5:47
11.	"Sway"	Clifford, Peacock, Ishihara, Iida Kazuhisa	9:17

== Credits ==
Credits adapted from Seefeel compact disc booklet

- Seefeel – creator, performer
- Mark Clifford – producer
- Zavoloka – design
- Noel Summerville – mastering
- Fenk – photography

== See also ==
- 2011 in music
