= Scala (band) =

- Origin: London, England
- Genres: Dream pop, electronica
- Years active: 1996–1998
- Labels: Too Pure, Touch
- Spinoff of: Seefeel
- Past members: Sarah Peacock; Daren Seymour; Justin Fletcher; Mark Van Hoen

Scala was an electronic rock band from London, UK formed in 1996 by members of the band Seefeel. They released two singles, three albums, and two EPs over the following two years.

== History ==
The disintegration of the post-rock band Seefeel in 1996-1997 led to its lead member Mark Clifford continuing as essentially a solo act. The remaining members of Seefeel—Sarah Peacock, Justin Fletcher, and Daren Seymour—collaborated with former Seefeel member Mark Van Hoen to form the group Scala.

Scala released their debut album Beauty Nowhere in 1997 followed by two albums in 1998: To You in Alpha and Compass Heart. After working with Scala, Peacock continued work in the group January.

== Style ==
Exclaim! described the band's sound as "a crystal clear instrumental sound made of finely textured synths, guitar and drum machine patterns that should appeal to jaded listeners of both pop and 'electronica.'" Side Line wrote that 'Scala take the rhythmic, ambient guitar sonic veil of their progenitor, Seefeel, adds Sarah Peacock's glass-blown vocals and, most importantly (most prominently), lyrics that convey in their fragile psychic reservoir a richness of emotion and honesty, all wrapped around a misshapen center-piece: uncertainty." Alternative Press wrote that "Scala's music has a warped menace that makes guitars buzz like otherworldly insects. Sarah Peacock sings anti-torch songs about relationships in turmoil."

== Discography ==
=== LPs ===
- Beauty Nowhere (Touch, 1997)
- To You In Alpha (Too Pure, 1998)
- Compass Heart (Touch, 1998)

=== EPs ===
- Lips & Heaven (Too Pure, 1996)
- Slide EP (Too Pure, 1997)

=== Singles ===
- VDT (Too Pure, 1996)
- Tears (Too Pure, 1996)
