= Mark Clifford =

British musician

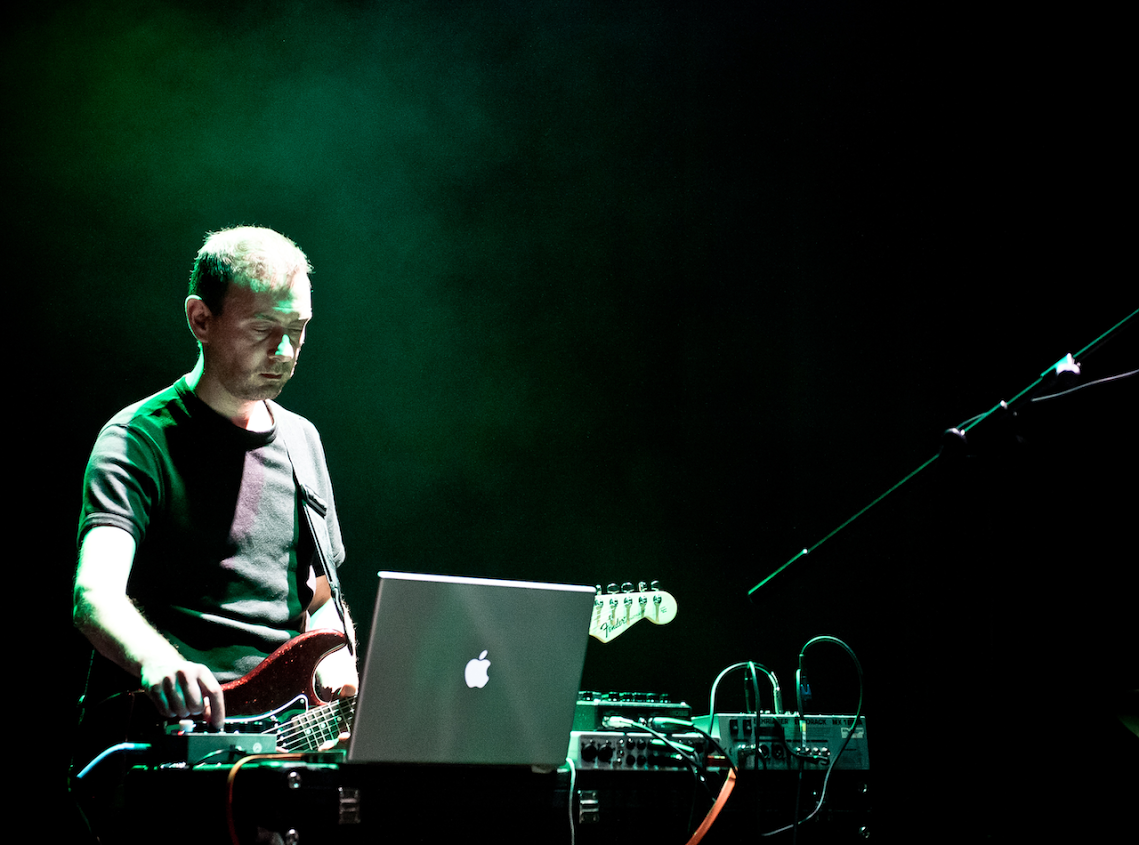
Mark Clifford live with Seefeel, 16 September 2010 at ICA in London.

Mark Clifford is a British musician and producer known primarily for his involvement with his band Seefeel. He has been involved in a number of solo and collaborative projects which have resulted in a wide range of material released on many different labels including Warp Records, Rephlex Records, Bella Union, Editions Mego and his own Polyfusia label.

== Seefeel ==
Seefeel was formed in 1992: Clifford advertising in local classifieds for members. In its earliest incarnation Sarah Peacock, Justin Fletcher and Mark Van Hoen represented guitar/vocals, drums and bass respectively, with Daren Seymour supplanting Van Hoen as the bassist early on. Too Pure signed Seefeel and published their first EPs and LP in 1993. Seefeel decamped to Warp Records in 1994 where they remain signed to this day, having released two LPs and three EPs with them thus far. 1996 also saw the release of a mini album, (CH-VOX) on Rephlex Records. Around 1999 Seefeel went on an indefinite hiatus only to reconvene in 2008 with a new Bassist and drummer, Shigeru Ishihara and Iida Kazuhisa.

== Solo projects ==
Aside from his work with Seefeel, Clifford has released two mini albums, 1995's Looking for Snags & 1996's Clean, Pit and Lid, under the name Disjecta for Warp Records. The name of the project was taken from the literature of Samuel Beckett. A 4 track Disjecta EP, True Love by Normal, was also released in 2003 on Clifford's own Polyfusia label. 1996 also saw the release of a 4 track vinyl-only EP titled Souff Souff on Warp under the guise of Woodenspoon. Clifford has produced and remixed a number of different artists including Autechre (as Seefeel), Nav Katze (as Seefeel & Disjecta), Mira Calix, Bowery Electric and School of Seven Bells (as Seefeel).

== Work With Cocteau Twins ==
Clifford, being an admirer of Scottish band Cocteau Twins, sent a copy of Seefeel's debut EP, More Like Space, to them in 1994 as a gesture not expecting it to incite anything in particular. To his surprise the band loved it and contacted him requesting he collaborate with them on a new EP of remixes. The result of this collaborative project was 1995's Otherness consisting of four remixed tracks. Clifford would also tour with the band in 1996, performing live remixes on stage as well as DJing.

== Other collaborative projects ==
Following the initial dissolution of Seefeel Clifford formed a collaborative project called Sneakster with vocalist Sophie Hinkley. They released two EPs and an LP in 1999 on Robin Guthrie's label Bella Union. Periodically between 1999 and 2004 Clifford met with friend and collaborator Mira Calix to record material. A retrospective of this material titled Lost Foundling was released in 2010 on Andrea Parker (DJ)'s label Aperture. Clifford has released a collaborative album with Simon Kealoha (Calika) and a split EP with Zavoloka, both on his Polyfusia label. Mark Clifford also works with musician Scott Douglas Gordon (Loops Haunt) under the project title Oto Hiax. Their first, self-titled album, was released by Editions Mego in 2017
