= Selected Ambient Works =

Selected Ambient Works is the name of two albums released in the early 1990s by the British musician Aphex Twin:

- Selected Ambient Works 85–92 (1992), commonly abbreviated as SAW 85–92 or SAW I
- Selected Ambient Works Volume II (1994), commonly abbreviated as SAW II
