= Th' Faith Healers =

English indie rock band

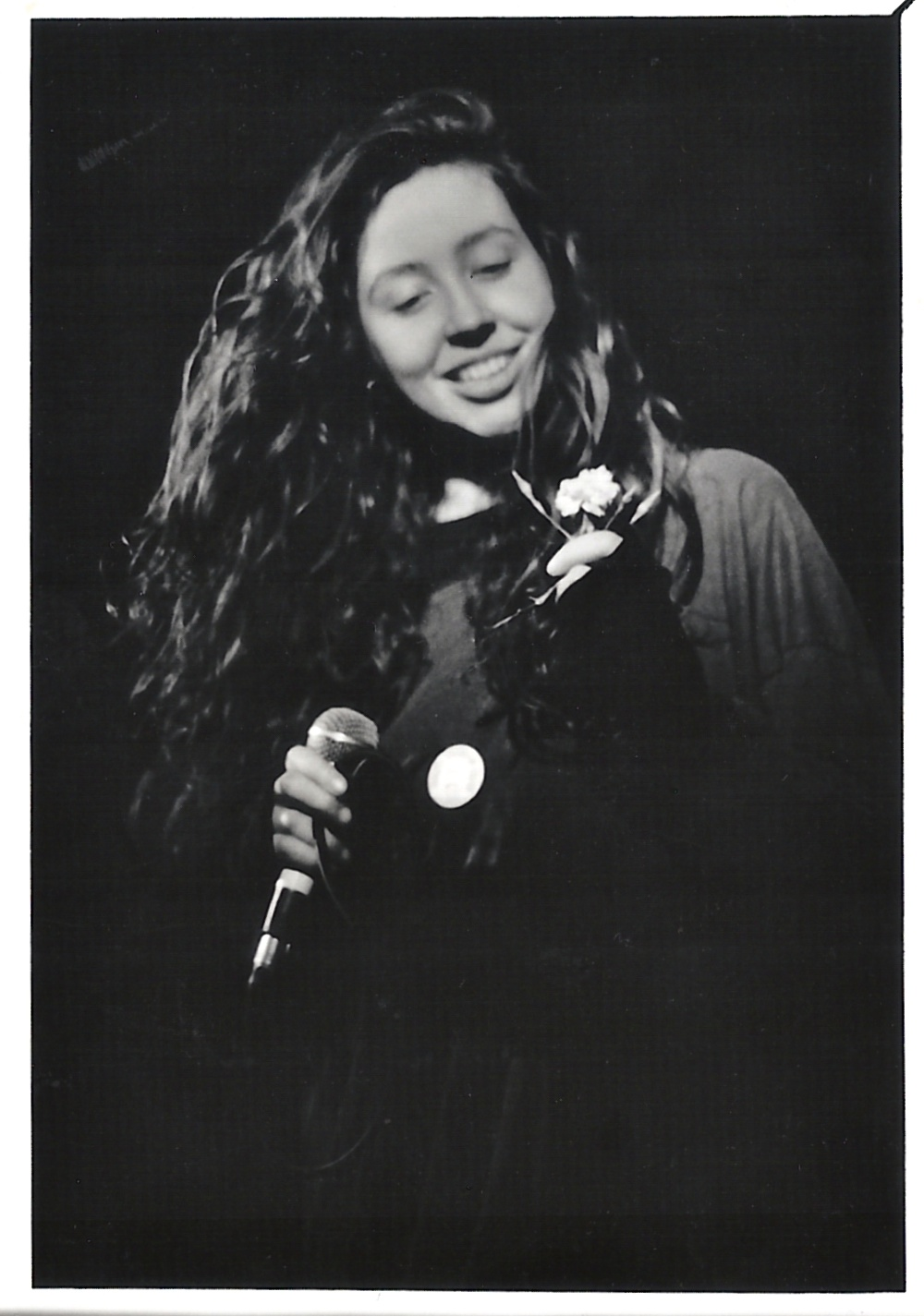
- Roxanne Stephen performing with Th' Faith Healers

Background information
- Origin: Hampstead, England
- Genres: Experimental rock; noise rock
- Years active: 1990–1994; 2006; 2009
- Labels: Too Pure; Elektra
- Past members: Roxanne Stephen; Tom Cullinan; Ben Hopkin; Joe Dilworth

Th' Faith Healers were an English indie rock band who were originally active between 1990 and 1994. They recorded multiple EPs and singles along with two full LPs.

== History ==
The members of the group were Roxanne Stephen (vocals), Tom Cullinan (guitar and vocals), Ben Hopkin (bass), and Joe Dilworth (drums).

Cullinan, who handled the bulk of the songwriting, went on to help form the band Quickspace. Signed to Too Pure in the United Kingdom, their albums were released by Elektra in the United States. Both albums feature clear krautrock influences, most evident in their cover of Can's "Mother Sky", from Lido.

Since their initial break-up in 1994, the band have reformed intermittently. They embarked on a short reunion tour in 2006 in conjunction with the release of their compilation Peel Sessions the previous year. The band reformed in 2009, playing at the All Tomorrow's Parties music festival twice, first in May (curated by The Breeders) and then again in December (curated by My Bloody Valentine).

== Discography ==
=== Studio albums ===
- Lido (1992, Too Pure)
- Imaginary Friend (1993, Too Pure)

=== Compilations ===
- Too Pure – The Peel Sessions (1992, Too Pure; compilation with PJ Harvey and Stereolab)
- L' (1992, Too Pure; a collection of tracks from the first three EPs)
- Peel Sessions (2005, Ba Da Bing)

=== EPs ===
- A Picture of Health (1991, Too Pure)
- In Love (1991, Too Pure)
- Mr Litnanski (1992, Too Pure)
