= Eyes Set Against the Sun =

Studio album by Mira Calix
- Released: 2007
- Genre: Electronica
- Length: 62:41
- Label: Warp Records

Mira Calix chronology
Skimskitta (2003)	Eyes Set Against the Sun (2007)

Professional ratings
Review scores
Source	Rating
The Guardian	3/5 stars
Pitchfork	7.2/10

Eyes Set Against the Sun is the third studio album by Mira Calix. It was released by Warp Records in 2007.

== Critical reception ==
Alex Macpherson of The Guardian gave the album 3 stars out of 5, saying, "Although Calix's tendency to favour snap and crackle over pop means she sometimes wanders into musical dead ends, that is outweighed by the atmosphere of bucolic peace she evokes."

== Track listing ==
No.	Title	Length
1.	"Because to Why"	5:27
2.	"The Stockholm Syndrome"	5:27
3.	"A Cereus Night"	1:18
4.	"Eeilo"	8:34
5.	"Protean"	2:37
6.	"The Way You Are When"	10:43
7.	"Tillsammans"	2:10
8.	"Umbra/Penumbra"	5:09
9.	"Belonging (No Longer Mix)"	10:54
10.	"One Line Behind"	10:18
