= Mira Calix =

British-based artist (1969–2022)

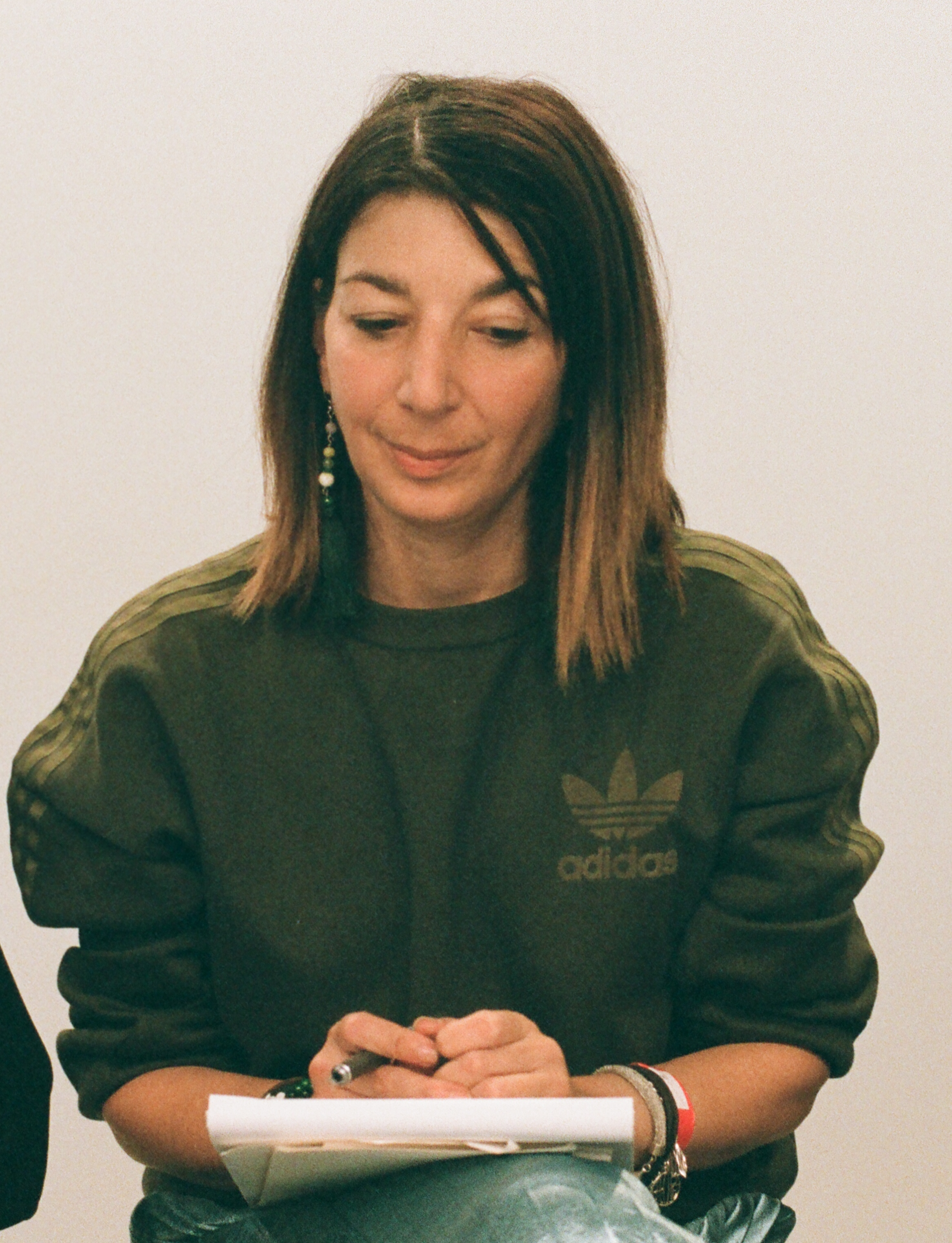
- Calix in 2016

Background information
- Born: Chantal Francesca Passamonte; 28 October 1969; Durban, South Africa
- Died: 25 March 2022 (aged 52) Bedford, England
- Genres: Electronic, classical
- Years active: 1996–2022
- Label: Warp
- Website: www.miracalix.com

Chantal Francesca Passamonte (28 October 1969 – 25 March 2022), known professionally as Mira Calix (/ˈmɪrə ˈkeɪlɪks/ MIRR-ə KAY-liks), was a South African-born British-based audio and visual artist and musician signed to Warp Records. She also worked as Warp's press officer.

Although her earlier music is almost exclusively electronic, from the 2000s onwards she incorporated writing for classical instrumentation into her musical works and expanded her practice to include multidisciplinary performance, film and multi-channel installation artworks. She often stated that she considered sound a sculptural material.

== Biography ==
Calix was born Chantal Francesca Passamonte in Durban, South Africa, on 28 October 1969. She was raised in Durban in a liberal middle-class family of Italian descent. She grew up learning ballet and listening to jazz and classical music. She moved to London in 1991. She began to work at a record shop and took up organising parties and DJing. She worked at the labels 4AD and Warp Records, where she held the position of a publicist from 1994 to 1997. In the late 1990s, Calix married Sean Booth, a member of the electronic duo Autechre. The two separated in 2005.

Calix's earlier music specialised in mixing her intimate vocals with jittering beats, experimental electronic textures and natural sounds. In 2003, she collaborated with the London Sinfonietta for the first time. Nunu premiered at the Royal Festival Hall in London at a concert titled "Warp Works and 20th Century Masters". The piece then toured internationally, performed by a mixture of orchestra, Calix on electronics, and, unusually, live insects. Subsequently, she incorporated orchestration and live classical instruments in her performances and recorded work. She worked with visual artists and musicians from other disciplines to create music for dance, theatre, film, opera, and installations. Calix was commissioned to write for the London Sinfonietta, Bang on a Can, the Aldeburgh Festival, the Royal Shakespeare Company, Opera North, Streetwise Opera, the Manchester International Festival, National Arts Festival, Sydney Festival, Royal Northern Sinfonia, and more.

In 2004, she formed Alexander's Annexe, a band/ensemble with pianist Sarah Nicolls and sound designer David Sheppard. Their debut performance was at the Ravello Festival in Italy, followed by performances at the Aldeburgh Festival and Parco della Musica in Rome. Alexander's Annexe released the album Push Door To Exit on Warp in November 2006. Calix consistently titled her works and albums in lower case, having rejected capitalisation due to her introduction to the work of E. E. Cummings as a child.

As a live performer and DJ, Calix supported and toured with Radiohead, Boards of Canada, Godspeed You! Black Emperor, Autechre, and other artists. She performed at Sonar, Glastonbury, All Tomorrow's Parties, Coachella, Latitude, and other concert halls and festivals.

== Commissioned work ==
Calix had a long history of creating works presented as installation, film, theatre, and dance, as well as more traditional concerts and musical performances. She had a collaborative practice, often working with those from other disciplines, in particular the sciences. These projects were commissioned by some of the world's leading institutions and were often presented as public artworks.

In early 2008, Calix was commissioned to set Shakespeare's "Sonnet 130" to music. The project was curated by composer Gavin Bryars for The Royal Shakespeare Company. During 2007, there were two theatrical works; the first, an opera titled Elephant and Castle, for the Aldeburgh Festival, was a collaboration with composer Tansy Davies, directed by Tim Hopkins, libretto by author Blake Morrison. The second, Dead Wedding, premiered at the first Manchester International Festival. Extracts from these performances appear on the album The Elephant in the Room: 3 Commissions. The album also includes pieces from a video installation work titled Natures, a collaboration with video artist Quayola and cellist Oliver Coates.

In December 2008, My Secret Heart premiered at the Royal Festival Hall in London with 100 members of Streetwise Opera. The installation piece, inspired by Gregorio Allegri's 17th-century choral work Miserere, is a collaboration with British video artists Flat-E. In December 2009, Calix won a British Composer Award for My Secret Heart. It was described by the judges as "transformational, capturing raw humanity and giving voice to the disenfranchised in a sound-world which is original, absorbing and unsettling". My Secret Heart also won a Royal Philharmonic Society Award in 2009 and was nominated for a National Lottery Arts Award in 2010. The installation toured in other countries too, both with The Creators Project and The British Council. In February 2009, she collaborated with United Visual Artists on Chorus for the opening of the Howard Assembly Rooms in Leeds. The installation piece, which was also exhibited at Durham Cathedral and The Wapping Project, won an Award of Distinction in the Interactive Category at Prix Ars Electronica in 2010. Calix continued to work with UVA in 2019 for an installation at 180 The Strand.

In 2009, she contributed a cover of a Boards of Canada song, "In A Beautiful Place Out in the Country", featuring cellist Oliver Coates, to the Warp20 compilation. Later in the year, she worked with Malcolm Middleton of Arab Strap on a session for BBC Radio 3's Late Junction.

In 2010, Calix worked with poet Alice Oswald on another commission for Opera North and collaborated for the first time with the ensemble Bang on a Can. Calix and the ensemble premiered Spring Falls Back at the World Financial Center Winter Garden in New York. She also spent the year working on an R&D project to develop her skills in orchestration with composers Tansy Davies and Larry Goves. Exchange and Return, an 18-month-long collaborative project, was awarded a Grant for the Arts by Arts Council England.

In 2011, Calix wrote a choral score for Fables – A Film Opera, working once more with visual artists Flat-e and Streetwise Opera. The film soundtrack, based on the fable of "The Boy Who Cried Wolf", was nominated for a British Composers Award that year.

In 2012, Calix created an interactive site-specific sound sculpture for the cultural Olympiad. "Nothing Is Set In Stone" was presented by the Mayor Of London and Oxford Contemporary Music in partnership with the Natural History Museum and was situated at Fairlop Waters. The sonic aspects of this multichannel work combined her score for a South African choir and field recordings.

In 2013, Calix collaborated with United Visual Artists to create a permanent sound and light installation in the city of Bath by the Two Tunnels Group in the Combe Down Tunnel walking and cycling path.

In 2015, Calix created a large-scale mixed media installation, "Inside There Falls", a mixed media installation at Carriageworks, during the Sydney Festival. Her multi-sensory artwork consisted of an 180-channel orchestral score and spoken word diffused through custom-made speakers incorporated into 1.5 km of hand-crushed paper. She invited Rafael Bonachela, choreographer and director of the Sydney Dance Company, to collaborate with her. Dancers wore hidden speakers and performed intermittently throughout the durational installation work. The audience was invited to immerse themselves in the work and don paper suits. It was on this project that Calix initiated her practice of creating what she termed "human diffusion" incorporating small speakers into costumes of performers to create sound installations that are mobile.

In 2016, Calix presented Moving Museum35, a multichannel mixed-media sound artwork installed in a commuter bus in Nanjing, China. The installation ran for three months and was the first public artwork presented in the city. It was supported by the British Council, JCDecaux, Amnua Museum of Contemporary Art and Nanjing University of The Arts as part of UKinChina2015.

In 2017, Calix wrote the scores for two productions in the Royal Shakespeare Company's Rome Season directed by Angus Jackson: Julius Caesar for brass and electronics and Coriolanus for string quartet and soprano. The plays ran for the entire year between the RSC theatre in Stratford-upon-Avon and the Barbican in London.

In 2018, Calix created "vicissitude of the divided and united", a score for choir presented as a large-scale multichannel sound and light installation in collaboration with Tom Piper. The work "Beyond the Deepening Shadow" was commissioned by Historic Palaces London and presented at the Tower of London to mark the centenary of the end of the Great War. She chose to use the text of the remarkable but forgotten poet Mary Borden to connect the geopolitical turbulence of that period and the divisiveness of the current climate.

In 2019, Calix presented a multidisciplinary performance and installation artwork at Bozar in Brussels in response to artist Michelangelo Pistoletto's "Third Paradise" project.

In 2020, Calix created a new digital-instrument that re-voices John Cage's music in response to the percussiveness of his sounds, extending the scope of the Sonatas using her own, idiomatic sound-world, and making connections between Cage's music and contemporary electronics. She brings body into the work, transcribing and reciting recordings of Cage's life partner, Merce Cunningham, leading dance rehearsals for the release and project titled "John Cage remixed".

In 2021, Calix exhibited "16 weeks", an audiovisual artwork part of a series of works based on the signification of data, at Mimosa House, London.

== Recording history ==
Calix's debut album, One on One, was released by Warp on 6 March 2000. This was followed by the studio albums Skimskitta in 2003 and Eyes Set Against the Sun in 2007. Two albums of commissioned works, 3 Commissions (2004) and The Elephant In The Room: 3 Commissions (2008), were also released on Warp Records. Lost Foundling, a collaboration with Mark Clifford of the band Seefeel, was released on Aperture Records in 2010. Her Utopia EP, was released on Warp Records in 2019. The record shares its title with the short film written and directed by Adam Thirlwell, for which she wrote the original score. There have also been numerous remixes and contributions to compilations and two installation-related releases on The Vinyl Factory. Her original scores for Julius Caesar and Coriolanus are available through the Royal Shakespeare Company imprint. Calix ran a bespoke Calix Portal through Bleep Records, on which many of her classical works can be found.

== Death ==
Calix died by suicide at her home in Bedford, England on 25 March 2022 at the age of 52.

== Discography ==
=== Albums ===
- One on One (2000)
- Skimskitta (2003)
- Eyes Set Against the Sun (2007)
- Lost Foundling 1999-2004 (2010, collaboration with Mark Clifford of Seefeel)
- Julius Caesar (2018, directed by Angus Jackson for The Royal Shakespeare Company)
- Coriolanus (2018, directed by Angus Jackson for The Royal Shakespeare Company)
- ~~absent~~ origin (2021)

=== EPs and singles ===
- Ilanga EP (1996)
- "Pin Skeeling" (single) (1998)
- Peel Session TX 09/03/00 (2000)
- "Prickle" (single) (2001)
- Nunu (2003)
- 3 Commissions EP (2004)
- The Elephant in the Room: 3 Commissions (2008)
- "If then while for" (2014)
- Utopia EP (2019)

=== Soundtracks ===
- Transparent Roads (2008)
- Onibus (2009)
- Khala – Shot List (2009)
- The Orestei – directed by Adele Thomas for Shakespeare's Globe (2017)
- The Other Side of Mars – directed by Minna Långström, napafilms (2019)

=== Awards ===
- Royal Philharmonic Society Award – My Secret Heart – winner (2009)
- British Composers Award – My Secret Heart – winner – Community Category (2009)
- Rencontres Audiovisuelles – Strata No. 2 – Best Original Soundtrack – winner (2010)
- Grant for the Arts – the Arts Council of England/Escalator Music (2010)
- National Lottery Arts Award – My Secret Heart – nominee (2010)
- Award of Distinction – Prix Ars Electronica – Chorus with United Visual Artists (2010)
- British Composers Award – Fables – A Film Opera – nominee – Outreach Category (2011)
- Lovie Award - Ode To The Future - Gold & People's Award (Internet Video: Music & Entertainment, 2019)
- London International Awards: Finalist (Music & Sound: Music Original – Score) - Ode To the Future (2019)
- Golden Award of Montreux: Gold Medal (Music) - Ode to the Future
