= (CH-VOX) =

Studio album by Seefeel
- Released: 11 November 1996
- Genre: Electronic; dark ambient; drone; experimental rock
- Length: 33:18; 53:45 (reissue)
- Label: Rephlex
- Producer: Seefeel

Seefeel chronology
Succour (1995)	(CH-VOX) (1996)	Seefeel (2011)

(CH-VOX) is the third studio album by British music group Seefeel. The album was released in 1996 on friend Richard D. James's label Rephlex Records.

== Release ==
(CH-VOX) was released on vinyl and compact disc on Rephlex Records on 11 November 1996. The album was made up of tracks recorded two years prior to its release.

(Ch-Vox) Redux was released on 14 May 2021, containing six previously unreleased tracks.

== Reception ==
Professional ratings
Review scores
Source	Rating
AllMusic	4/5 stars
The Encyclopedia of Popular Music	3/5 stars

Keir Langley of AllMusic called (CH-VOX) "an especially lush match of aesthetics — sort of a condensed version of the Aphex Twin landmark record, Selected Ambient Works II." Option called the album "memorable," writing that the band "isn't afraid of harsh textures if needed, but more importantly, they keep a pulse going."

== Track listing ==
All tracks are written by Mark Clifford except where otherwise noted

No.	Title	Writer(s)	Length
1.	"Utreat (Complete)"	Mark Clifford, Daren Seymour	4:31
2.	"E-Hix2"		5:07
3.	"Ch-Vox"	Clifford, Sarah Peacock	6:46
4.	"Hive"	Clifford, Seymour	5:18
5.	"Ashdecon"	Clifford, Peacock	5:25
6.	"Net"		6:11

Redux bonus tracks
No.	Title	Length
7.	"E-hix 5"	2:53
8.	"E-hix 4"	2:03
9.	"Evio"	2:26
10.	"Avatar"	2:30
11.	"E-hix 3"	7:05
12.	"Ashime"	3:10

== Personnel ==
- Seefeel – producer
- Dave Masters – photography
- Grant – layouts
- Mark – layouts
