= Mark Van Hoen =

English electronic music artist

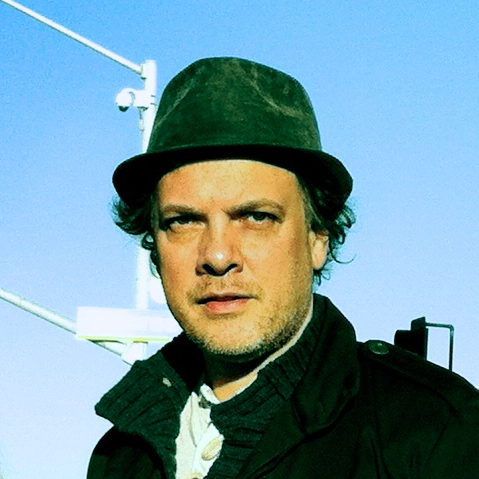

Background information
- Born: September 1966 (age 60); Croydon, London, England
- Genres: Electronic music, drone music, ambient music
- Years active: 1982–present
- Labels: Editions Mego, Apollo Records, Touch Music, City centre offices

Mark Van Hoen (born September 1966, Croydon, London, England) is an English electronic music artist. He has created music under his own name as well as Locust, and Autocreation.

== Career ==
In 1993, Van Hoen signed with the Belgian-based record label, R&S. The initial releases were as Locust and used vintage analogue synthesizers and tape recorders. As the Locust sound moved towards an increasingly more vocal oriented approach in the late 1990s, Van Hoen also began to release music under his own name.

In October 2013, Black Hearted Brother, Van Hoen's collaboration with Neil Halstead, released their debut album, Stars Are Our Home.

Pitchfork said, "Musically, Van Hoen belongs to a distinguished family tree. Originally influenced by the likes of Brian Eno and Tangerine Dream, and later presaging both Autechre's glitch and Boards of Canada's pastoral IDM, with his latest album [Where Is the Truth] Van Hoen would fit in just as well alongside White Rainbow or Atlas Sound on a current label like Kranky: He combines oceanic drone with pop lyricism, using technology as a catalyst." Other influences on Van Hoen have included the Human League, OMD, Gary Numan, Cabaret Voltaire and Kraftwerk.

== Discography as Locust ==
- 1993: Skysplit – R&S Records
- 1994: In Remembrance of Times Past – Apollo Records
- 1994: Natural Composite – Apollo Records
- 1994: Needle 12" – Apollo Records
- 1994: Weathered Well – Apollo Records
- 1995: Truth Is Born of Arguments – Apollo Records
- 1997: Morning Light – Apollo Records
- 2001: Wrong – Touch
- 2013: You'll Be Safe Forever – Editions Mego
- 2014: After The Rain
- 2020: The Plaintive
- 2023: The First Cause
- 2026: Spectral+

== Discography as Mark Van Hoen ==
- 1997: The Last Flowers From The Darkness – Touch
- 1998: Playing With Time – Apollo Records
- 2004: The Warmth Inside You – Locust Sound
- 2010: Where Is The Truth – City Centre Offices
- 2012: The Revenant Diary – Editions Mego
- 2017: The Worcester Tapes 1983-1987 – The Tapeworm
- 2018: Invisible Threads - - Touch
- 2025: The Eternal Present - Dell'Orso Records
