= Too Pure =

British independent record label

- Parent company: Beggars Group
- Founded: 1990
- Founder: Richard Roberts and Paul Cox
- Defunct: 2008
- Distributor: Beggars Group
- Genre: Alternative rock
- Country of origin: United Kingdom
- Location: London
- Official website: toopure.com

Too Pure Records was a London-based independent record label formed in 1990 by Richard Roberts and Paul Cox. The label gained prominence after the release of PJ Harvey's debut studio album Dry in 1992, and subsequently found further success in the late 1990s and early 2000s with albums by indie rock artists such as Mclusky and Electrelane. The label closed in 2008.

== History ==
Too Pure started off as an experimental label and built its reputation by releasing primarily alternative/independent music which its founders felt was being ignored by major labels. At its inception Too Pure was largely preoccupied by the so-called Camden Lurch scene, through its 'Sausage Machine' night in North London (documented by its Now That's Disgusting Music (1990) compilation). The label discovered PJ Harvey but was struggling to hold on to the artist after the success of single "Sheela Na Gig", as an industry feeding frenzy brought in a host of major labels. Eventually, Too Pure secured UK release rights as long as the album was licensed to Island Records for the rest of the world. Island picked up all futures of the band at the same time.

4AD founder Ivo Watts-Russell bought into the company to help the founders fund the signing of PJ Harvey, who was discovered at the Sausage Machine gigs. This enabled the label to release the PJ Harvey debut album Dry and develop and sign more artists. The label was briefly distributed in the US by Rick Rubin's American Recordings through Warner Bros. Records from 1995 to 1997 in a deal done by former agent and American Recordings exec Marc Geiger, in conjunction with founder Richard Roberts. Nick West, an old friend of Richard Roberts and formerly of Fiction Records and Polygram, was brought in to run Too Pure US, out of American Recordings' offices in Burbank, CA. The label had some notable successes at college radio in the US, with both Laika and Long Fin Killie playing Lollapalooza. Laika toured with both Radiohead and Tricky. The contract was bought out by American Recordings parent company Warner Bros in April 1997, after American Recordings hit financial difficulties.

Too Pure became majority owned by the Beggars Group, taking over and increasing the shareholding previously owned by Watts-Russell. Remaining founder Paul Cox and MD Nick West were minority shareholders. Co-founder and mainman, Richard Roberts moved to Australia in 1997, being replaced by Nick West. From 2001 the label was run by Jason White, formerly of the Mean Fiddler and the former press officer at Too Pure, following the departure of Nick West, who'd returned from the US to run the label as MD from 1997. Nick West also established the Derrière de la Garage publishing arm of the label in order to sign Hefner's publishing.

On 7 July 2008, it was announced on its Web site that Too Pure "is no more" and that "the artists currently on those labels will be released through 4AD," yet it will continue operating its Too Pure Singles Club. In 2009 Paul Riddlesworth took over the reins of the Too Pure singles club signing bands that include Pulled Apart by Horses, Friendship, Bear Hands, JEFF the Brotherhood, The Lucid Dream, DZ Deathrays, Fear of Men, The Lovely Eggs, Dead Skeletons, Deaf Club, False Advertising, Seize The Chair, Best Friends and HOOKWORMS. In 2013, the roster added Beard of Wolves, Seasfire, Menace Beach, Black Moth, Department M, Lola Colt and Sealings. The Singles Club continues to run as a subscription-based label.

== Artists ==
The following is an incomplete list of bands that recorded on the Too Pure label.

- Billy Mahonie
- Bows
- Electrelane
- Fear of Men
- Friendship
- Future of the Left
- Hefner
- Jack
- Kaputt
- Laika
- Long Fin Killie
- Mclusky
- Monade
- Moonshake
- Motormark
- Mouse on Mars
- Murry the Hump
- Peggy Sue
- PJ Harvey
- Pram
- Rothko
- Scout Niblett
- Scala
- Seefeel
- Seely
- Shooting at Unarmed Men
- Stereolab
- Suncarriage
- Th' Faith Healers
- The Keys
- The Rogers Sisters
- Tigercub
- Tracy and the Plastics
- Voodoo Queens

== See also ==
- Too Pure – The Peel Sessions
