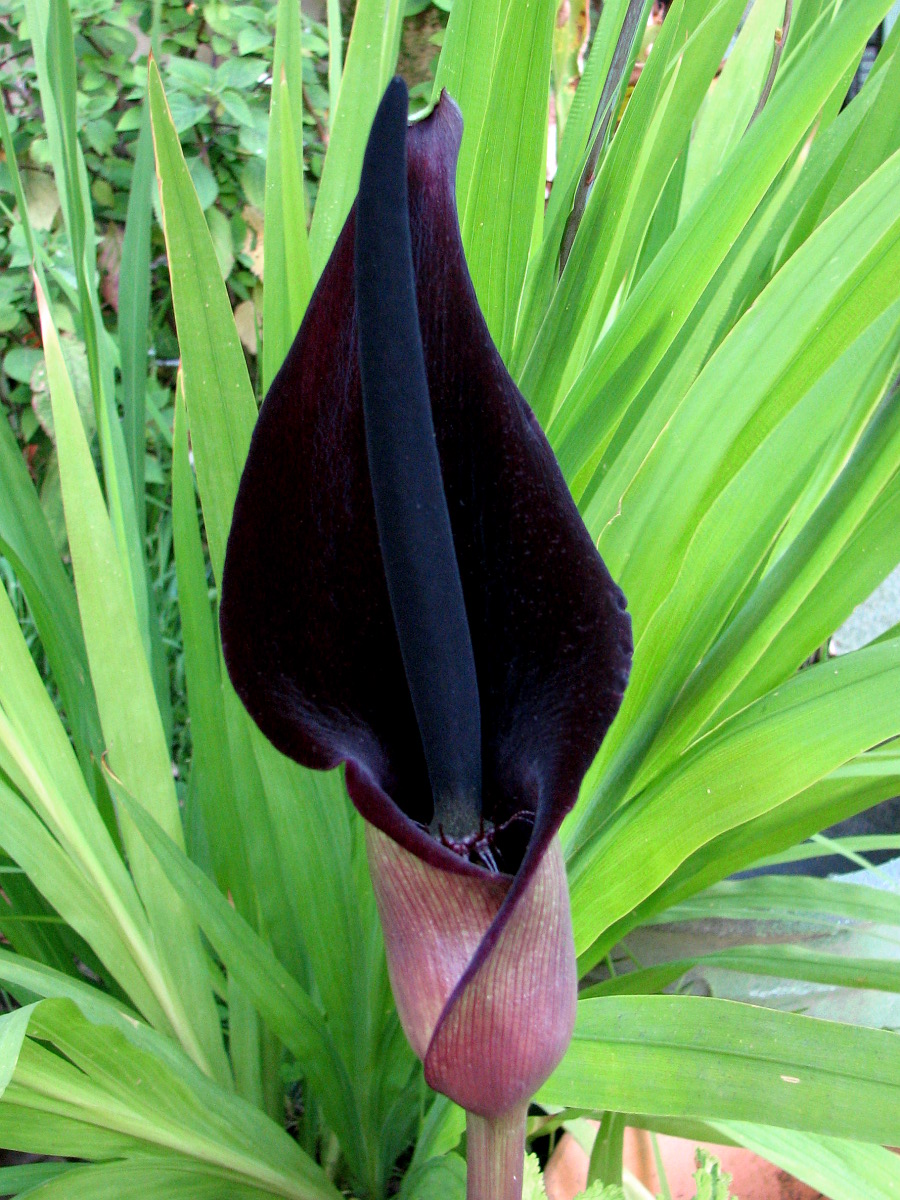
- Arum palaestinum

Scientific classification
- Kingdom: Plantae
- Clade: Tracheophytes
- Clade: Angiosperms
- Clade: Monocots
- Order: Alismatales
- Family: Araceae
- Subfamily: Aroideae
- Tribe: Areae
- Genus: Arum; L.
- Range of the genus Arum

Synonyms
- Aron Adans.; Gymnomesium Schott

= Arum =

Genus of flowering plants

Arum is a genus of flowering plants in the family Araceae. They are native to Europe, northern Africa, and western and central Asia, with the highest species diversity in the Mediterranean region. Frequently called arum lilies, they are not closely related to the true lilies Lilium. Plants in the closely related genus Zantedeschia are also called 'arum lilies'.

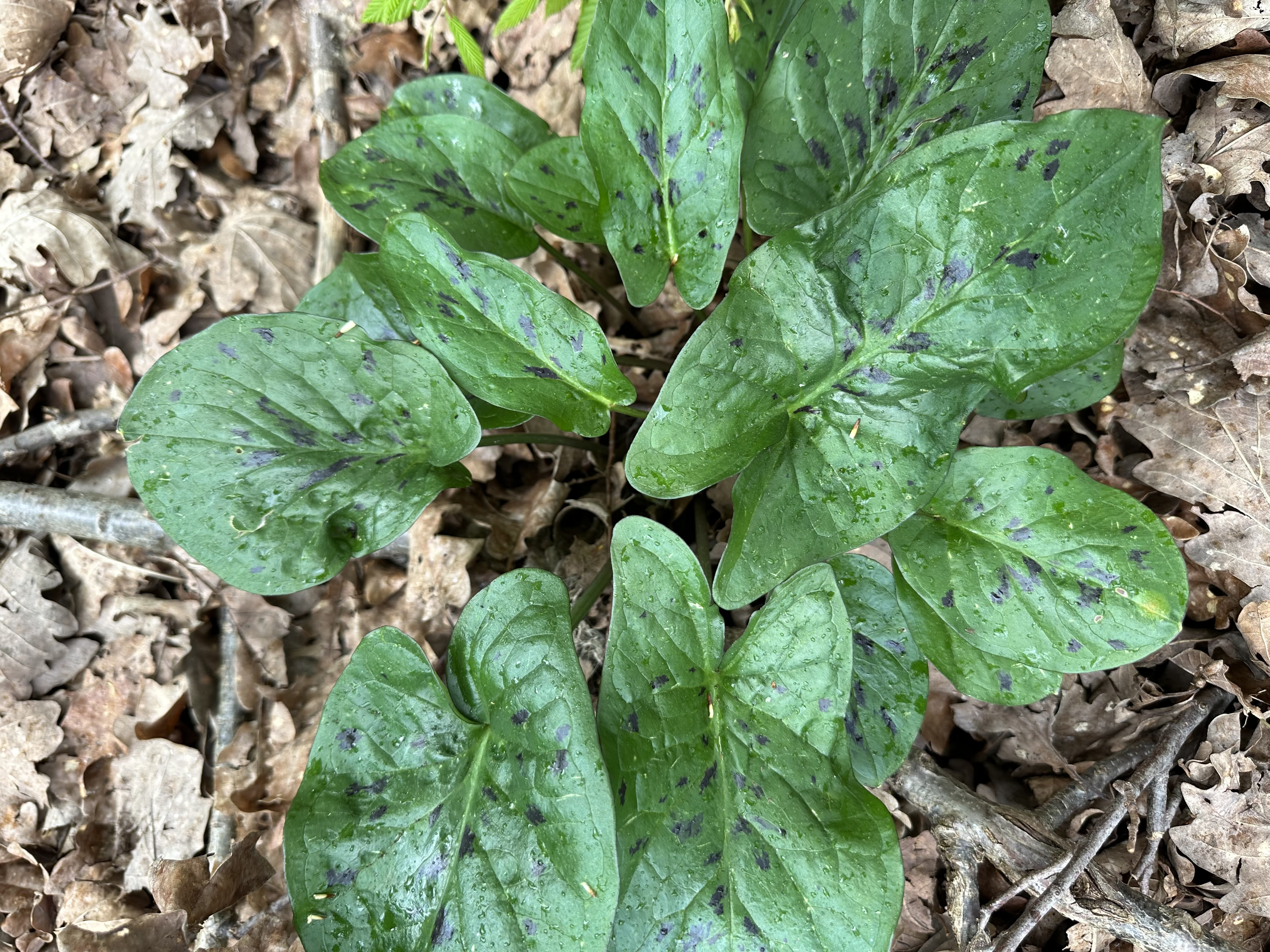
A type of Arum plant in a park in Paris

They are rhizomatous, herbaceous perennial plants growing to 20–60 cm (7.9–23.6 in) tall, with sagittate (arrowhead-shaped) leaves 10–55 cm (3.9–21.7 in) long. The flowers are produced in a spadix, surrounded by a 10–40 cm (3.9–15.7 in) long, distinctively coloured spathe, which may be white, yellow, brown, or purple. Some species are scented, others not. The fruit is a cluster of bright orange or red berries.

All parts of the plants, including the berries, are poisonous as they contain needle-shaped crystals of calcium oxalate. In spite of this, the plant has a history of culinary use among Arab peasants in Palestine who leached the toxins from the plant before the leaves were consumed.

The genus name is the Latinized form of the Greek name for these plants, aron.

== Inflorescence and pollination ==
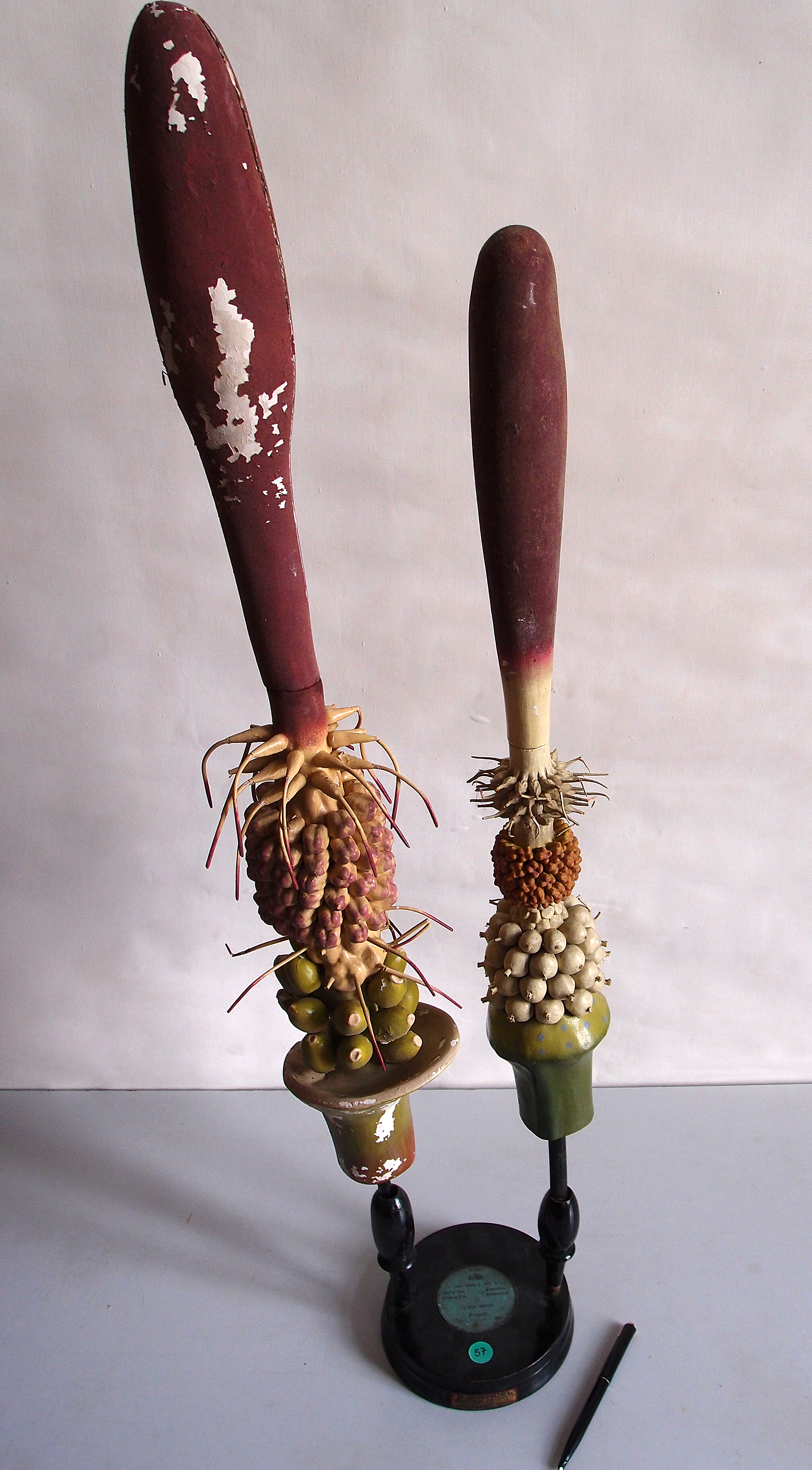
Historical model of the inner part of the inflorescence, the spadix with the flowers and ring of small hairs. Botanical Museum Greifswald.

The flowers are borne on a poker-shaped inflorescence called a spadix, which is partially enclosed in a spathe or leaf-like hood of varying colour. The flowers are hidden from sight, clustered at the base of the spadix with a ring of female flowers at the bottom and a ring of male flowers above them.

Above the male flowers is a ring of hairs forming an insect trap. The insects are trapped beneath the ring of hairs and are dusted with pollen by the male flowers before escaping and carrying the pollen to the spadices of other plants, where they pollinate the female flowers. Once the plant is pollinated, the small hairs wither away and the trapped insects are released.

After the inflorescence opens, the spadix heats up well above ambient temperature, due to a phenomenon called thermogenesis. This is caused by the rapid consumption of starch in cyanide insensitive respiration, which is biochemically different from the respiration normally found in plants. The heat is used to vaporize odour components, which in species with short "flower-stalks" cause a faecal smell. This in turn attracts the small flies and gnats that are to be trapped within the inflorescence. As the time required for successful pollination to occur can be several days, many of the small insects nevertheless die within the flower due to their short lifespan. Therefore, dead insects are frequently found within the inflorescence, when opened, sometimes leading the finder to believe it is a carnivorous plant – but that is not the case. No digestive enzymes or similar components are present; and in fact, once pollinated, the entire inflorescence starts withering except the central part, from which the berries later emerge.

Pollination-wise, the species of Arum can be split into two (or three) distinct groups. The "cryptic" species have the inflorescence on a relatively short stalk, and the odour released during the thermogenesis is recognizable to the human nose as distinctively faecal. These species are visited by insects with some relation to dung, such as owl-midges (Psychodidae) or fungus-gnats (Sciara). In northern Europe, only the cryptic-flowered species are found.

The other main group are called "flag" species, due to the inflorescence being on a long stalk. These species also exhibit thermogenesis, but if an odour is released it is not recognizable to the human nose, and it is debated if pollinators are attracted by a non-recognizable smell, the thermogenesis itself or visual attraction.

Finally the closely related A. idaeum and A. creticum does not seem to fit any of the two groups. A. creticum appears to be of the "flag" group but, as the only species, emits a pleasing lemony smell. The apparently "cryptic" A. idaeum does not emit a recognizable smell.

== Species ==
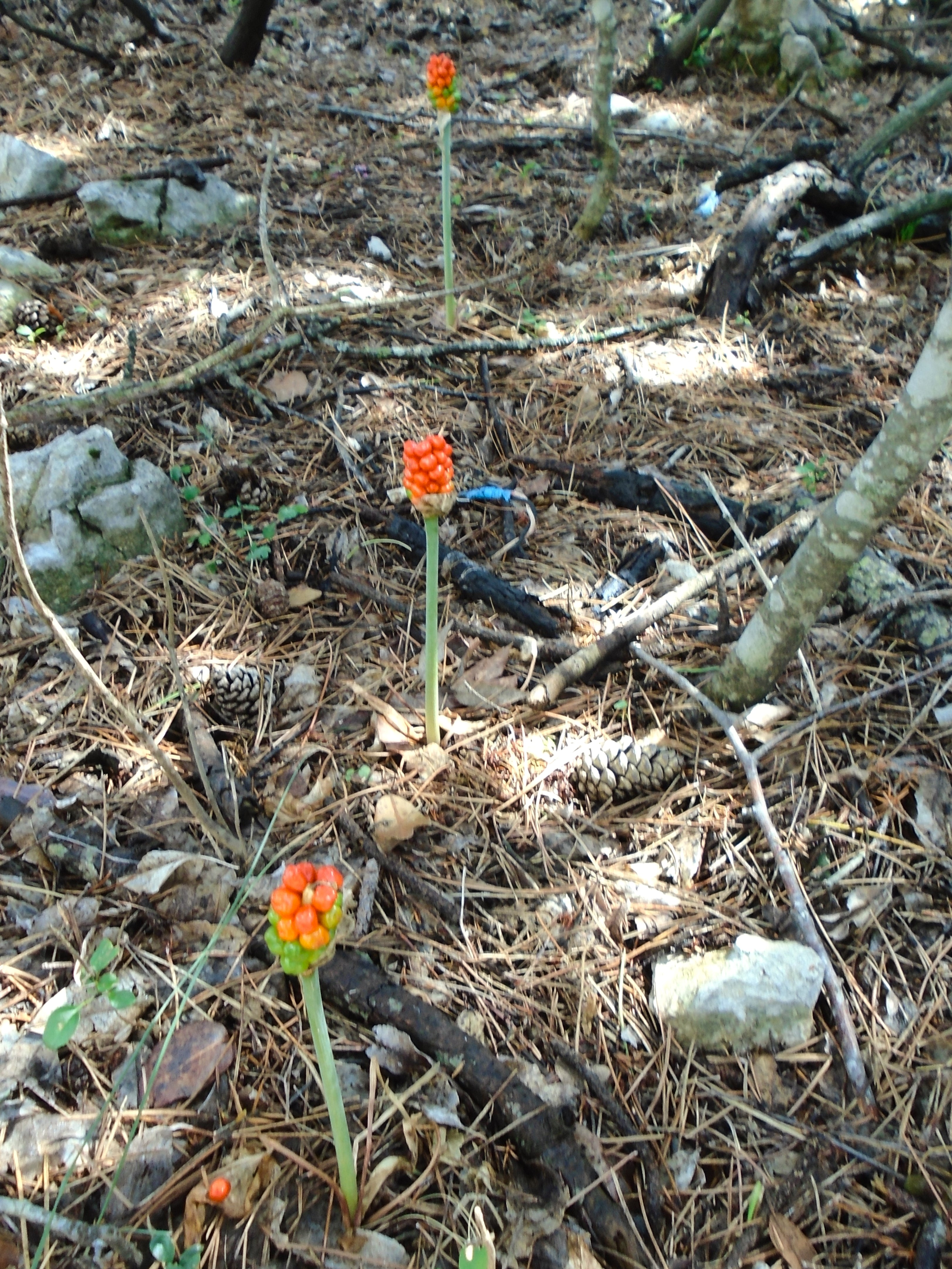
Arums in a forest at Vidova gora mountain, island of Brač, Croatia

As of February 2025, Plants of the World Online accepts the following 27 species and one hybrid:

- Arum apulum (Carano) P.C.Boyce – Italy (Apulia)
- Arum besserianum Schott – South Poland, Ukraine
- Arum concinnatum Schott – South Greece, Turkey
- Arum byzantinum Blume – Northwest Turkey
- Arum creticum Boiss. & Heldr. – Crete, Turkey
- Arum cylindraceum Gasp. – Central Europe, Iberian Peninsula, Italy, Balkans, Turkey, Cyprus
- Arum cyrenaicum Hruby – Crete, Libya (Cyrenaica)
- Arum dioscoridis Sm. – East Aegean, Cyprus, Turkey, Levant
- Arum euxinum R.R.Mill – Turkey (Bithynia)
- Arum gratum Schott – Lebanon, Syria
- Arum hainesii Riedl – East Iraq
- Arum hygrophilum Boiss. – Turkey, Levant, Cyprus, Morocco
- Arum idaeum Coustur. & Gand. – Crete
- Arum italicum Mill. – Mediterranean Europe, Britain, Maghreb, Crimea, Caucasus, Turkey, Iraq
- Arum jacquemontii Blume – Iran, Afghanistan, South Central Asia, West Himalayas
- Arum korolkowii Regel – North Iran, Afghanistan, Central Asia
- Arum lucanum Cavara & Grande – South Italy, Albania
- Arum maculatum L. – Europe, Turkey, West Caucasus
- Arum megobrebi Lobin, M.Neumann, Bogner & P.C.Boyce – Transcaucasus, NE Turkey
- Arum meryemianum Yıldırım – Turkey
- Arum nigrum Schott – Greece, Montenegro
- Arum orientale M.Bieb. – Carpathian Basin, Carpathians, Balkans, Crimea, Donbass, Caucasus, Turkey, Levant
- Arum palaestinum Boiss. – Levant
- Arum pictum L.f. – Corsica, Sardinia, Balearics
- Arum purpureospathum P.C.Boyce – Crete
- Arum rupicola Boiss. – Lesbos, Turkey, Transcaucasus, Iran, Levant, Iraq
- Arum sintenisii (Engl.) P.C.Boyce – Cyprus, Turkey
- Arum × sooi Terpó – Hungary, Spain
- Arum taiwanianum S.S.Ying – Taiwan

Formerly placed here:

- Arum triphyllum L. – now Arisaema triphyllum (L.) Schott
- Arum dracunculus L. – now Dracunculus vulgaris Schott

== Distribution and habitat ==
Distribution maps for all species were published in a 2010 paper.

== Taxonomy ==
Most literature on the genus Arum deals specifically with either A. maculatum or A. italicum. Among remaining species, A. dioscoridis is the most frequently mentioned.

Boyce published an overview of taxonomic classifications of Arum in 1989.

Classification of Boyce 1989 (with updates):

- Subgenus Gymnomesium
  - A. pictum
- Subgenus Arum
  - Section Arum
    - A. concinnatum
    - A. byzantinum
    - A. italicum
    - A. maculatum
    - A. megobrebi
  - Section Dioscoridea
    - Subsection Alpina
      - A. alpinum (A. cylindraceum)
    - Subsection Discroochiton
      - A. alpinariae
      - A. apulum
      - A. balansanum
      - A. cyrenaicum
      - A. elongatum
      - A. besserianum
      - A. gratum
      - A. hainesii
      - A. longispathum
      - A. lucanum
      - A. nigrum
      - A. orientale
      - A. purpureospathum
    - Subsection Tenuifila
      - A. jacquemontii
      - A. korolkowii
      - A. rupicola
    - Subsection Hygrophila
      - A. euxinum
      - A. hygrophilum
      - A. sintenisii
    - Subsection Poeciloporphyrochiton
      - A. dioscoridis
      - A. palaestinum
    - Subsection Cretica
      - A. creticum
      - A. idaeum

Chloroplast classification (2010):

- Subgenus Gymnomesium
  - A. pictum
- Subgenus Arum
  - Section Arum
    - A. maculatum
    - Nigrum-Italicum subsection
      - A. nigrum
      - Italicum complex
      - A. concinnatum
      - A. byzantinum
      - A. italicum
  - Section Poeciloporphyrochiton
    - A. dioscoridis
    - A. palaestinum
  - Large section
    - A. creticum
    - A. idaeum
    - A. jacquemontii
    - A. korolkowii
    - A. rupicola
    - Subsection Hygrophila
      - A. euxinum
      - A. hygrophilum
      - A. sintenisii
    - Subsection Discroochiton
      - A. elongatum
      - Large series
        - A. gratum
        - Cylindraceum complex
          - A. apulum
          - A. balansanum
          - A. cylindraceum
          - A. cyrenaicum
          - A. euxinum
          - A. lucanum
          - A. purpureospathum

Combined chloroplast-ITS sequence classification (2010):

- Subgenus Gymnomesium
  - A. pictum
- Subgenus Arum
  - Section Arum
    - A. maculatum
    - Nigrum-Italicum subsection
      - A. nigrum
      - Italicum complex
      - A. concinnatum
      - A. byzantinum
      - A. italicum
  - Section Poeciloporphyrochiton
    - A. dioscoridis
    - A. palaestinum
  - Large section
    - Subsection Cretica
      - A. creticum
      - A. idaeum
    - Subsection Hygrophila
      - A. hygrophilum
      - A. sintenisii
    - Subsection Tenuifila
      - A. rupicola
      - Jacquemontii-Korolkowii complex
        - A. jacquemontii
        - A. korolkowii
    - Subsection Discroochiton
      - A. elongatum
      - Large series
        - A. gratum
        - Cylindraceum complex
          - A. apulum
          - A. balansanum
          - A. cylindraceum
          - A. cyrenaicum
          - A. euxinum
          - A. lucanum
          - A. purpureospathum

The ancestor of the genus is thought to have had dung/urine scented flowers for attracting flies and beetles, but over time several clades have moved to different pollinator attraction strategies. In an example of convergent evolution, A. gratum, A. palaestinum and A. sintenisii produce a fruity scent, to attract Drosophila species and others. Apparent scentlessness has evolved in Subsection Tenuifila, A. cylindraceum, A. hygrophilum, A. euxinum and A. lucanum. Subsection Cretica has evolved a sweet scent to attract bees and other insects.

== Uses ==
Despite the presence of irritant raphides, which act together with unverified proteinaceous toxins, most parts of all species have been used as food, and continue to be used today. Use is uncommon because of the duration required to reduce aroid raphides to safe levels.

== Gallery ==
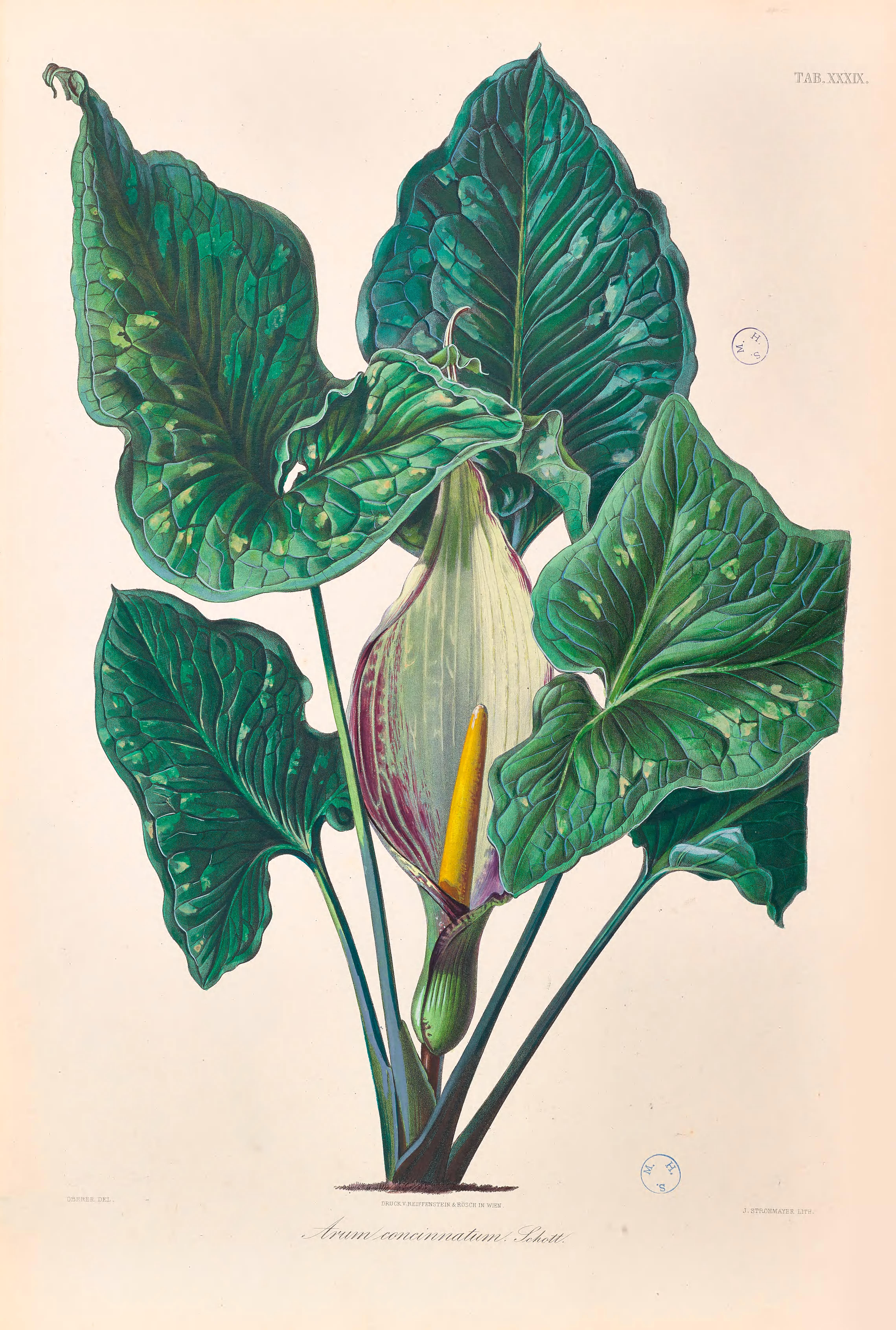
A. concinnatum

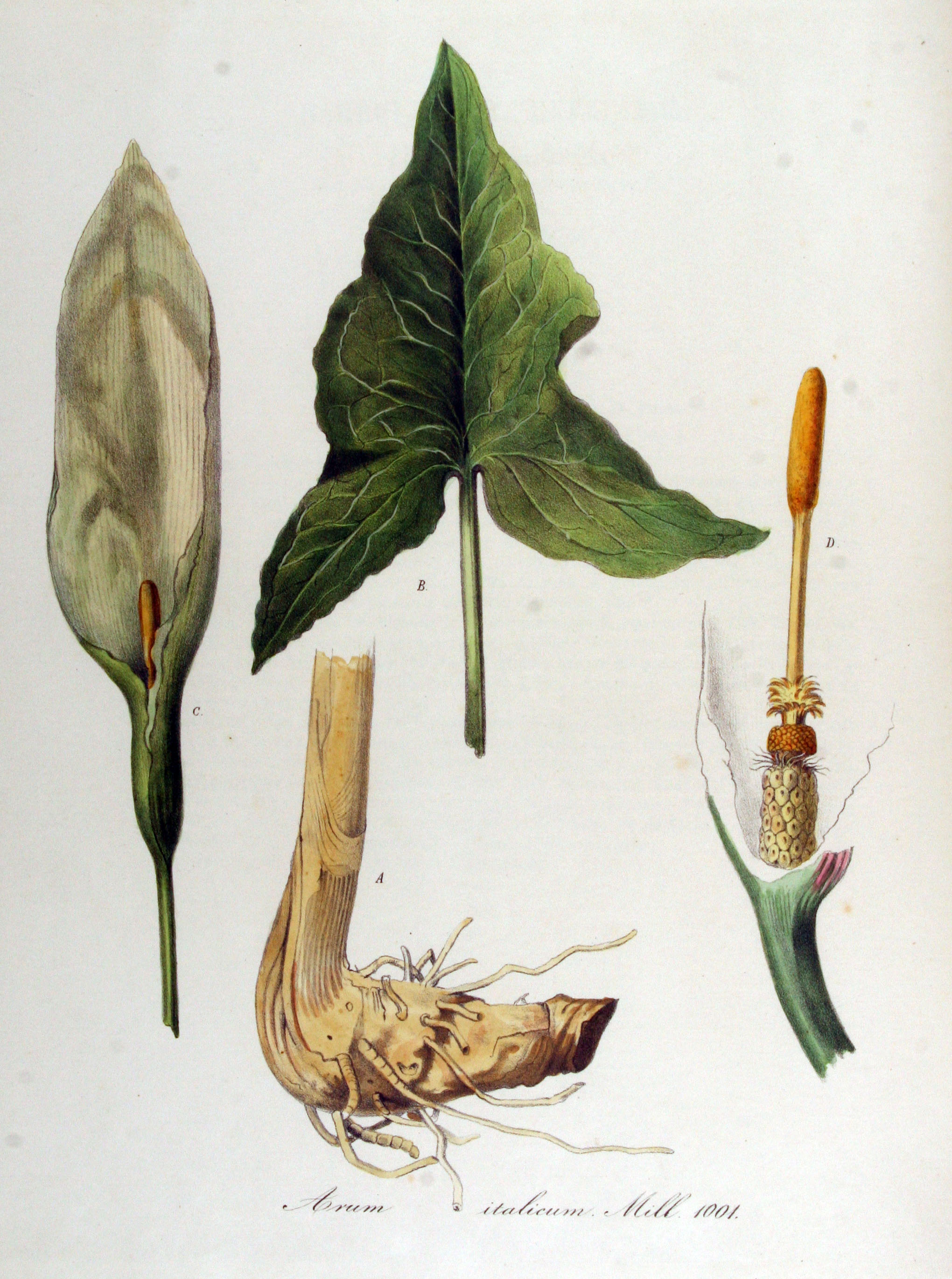
A. italicum

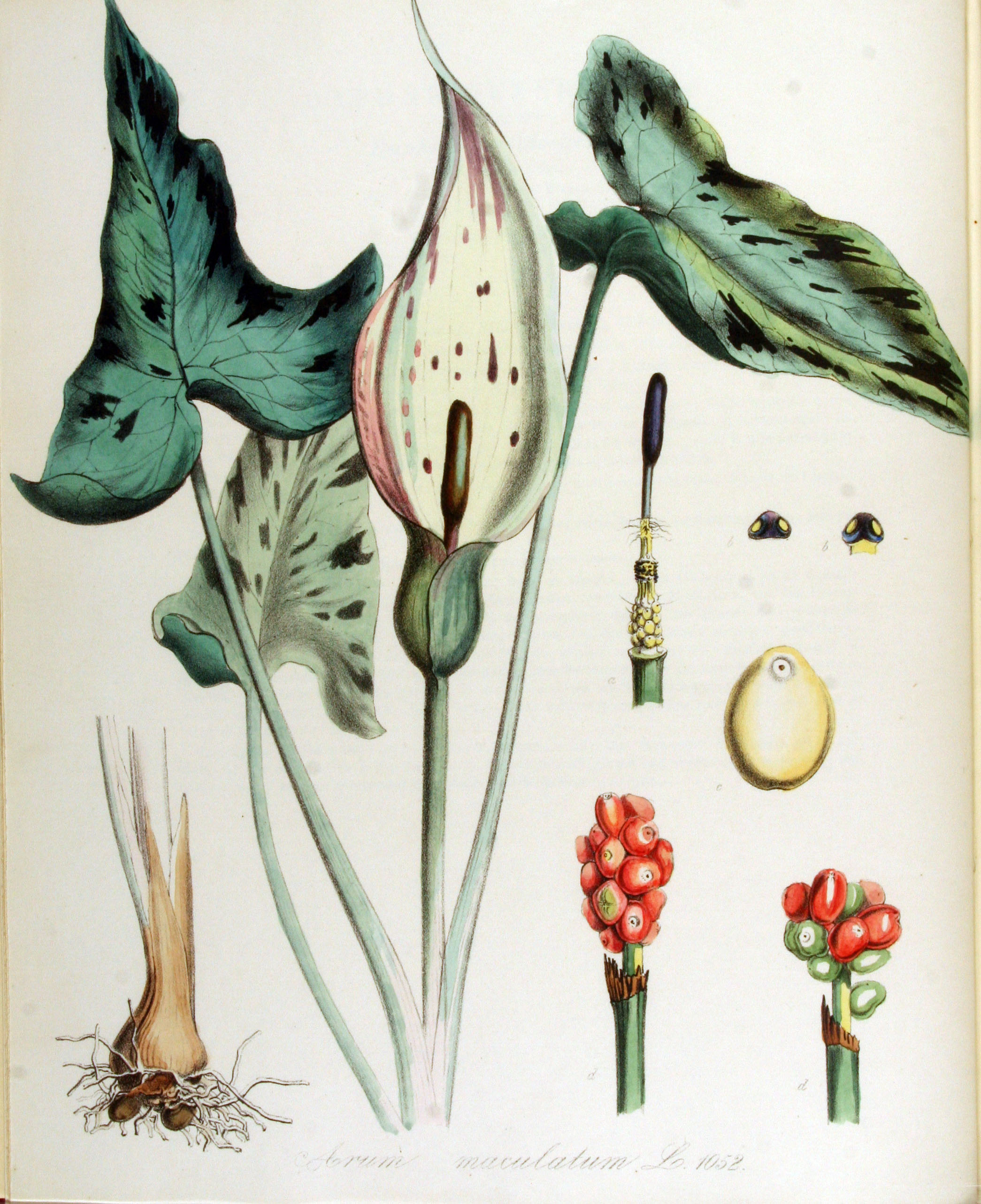
A. maculatum

=== Leaves ===
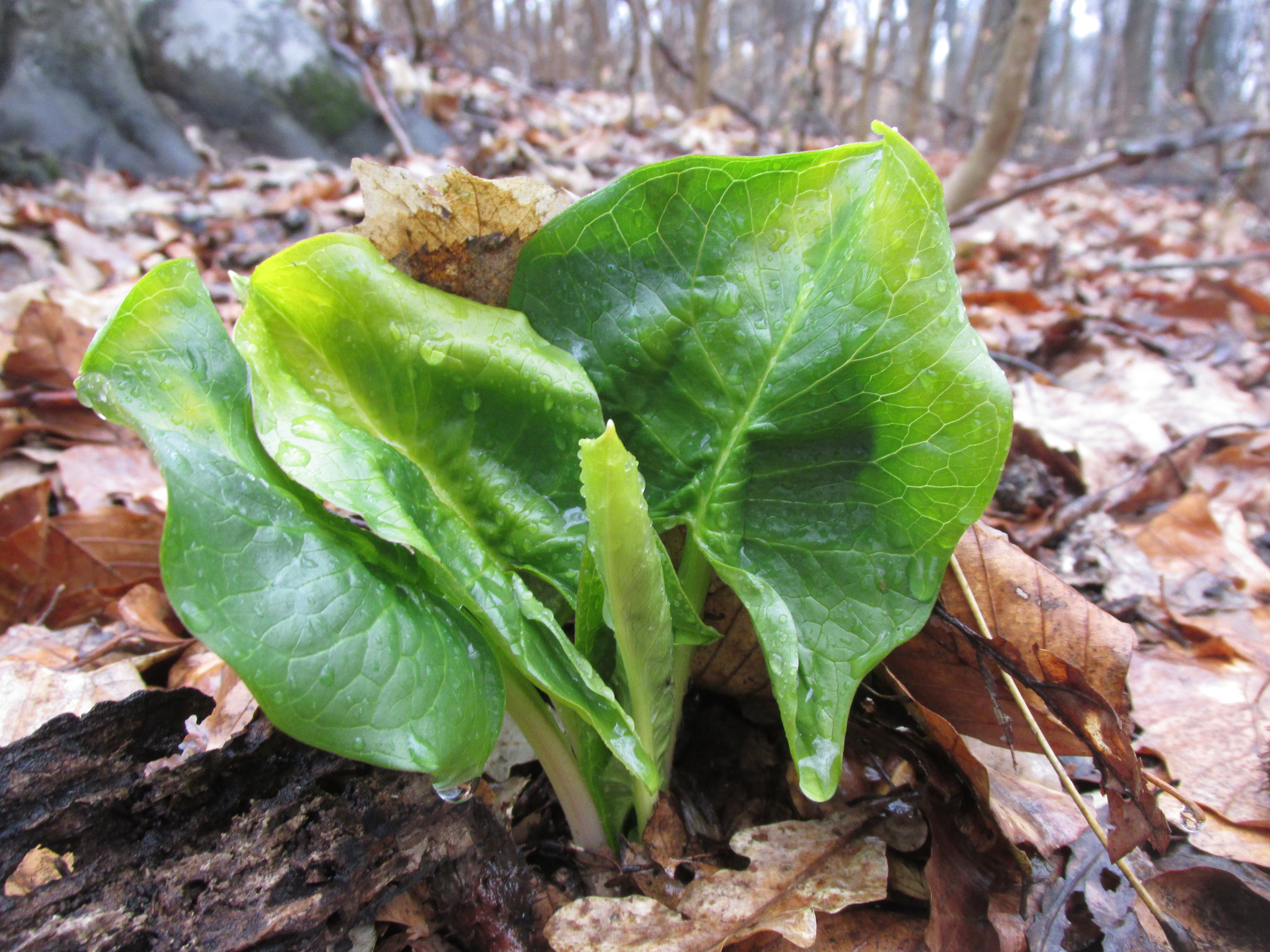
A. besserianum

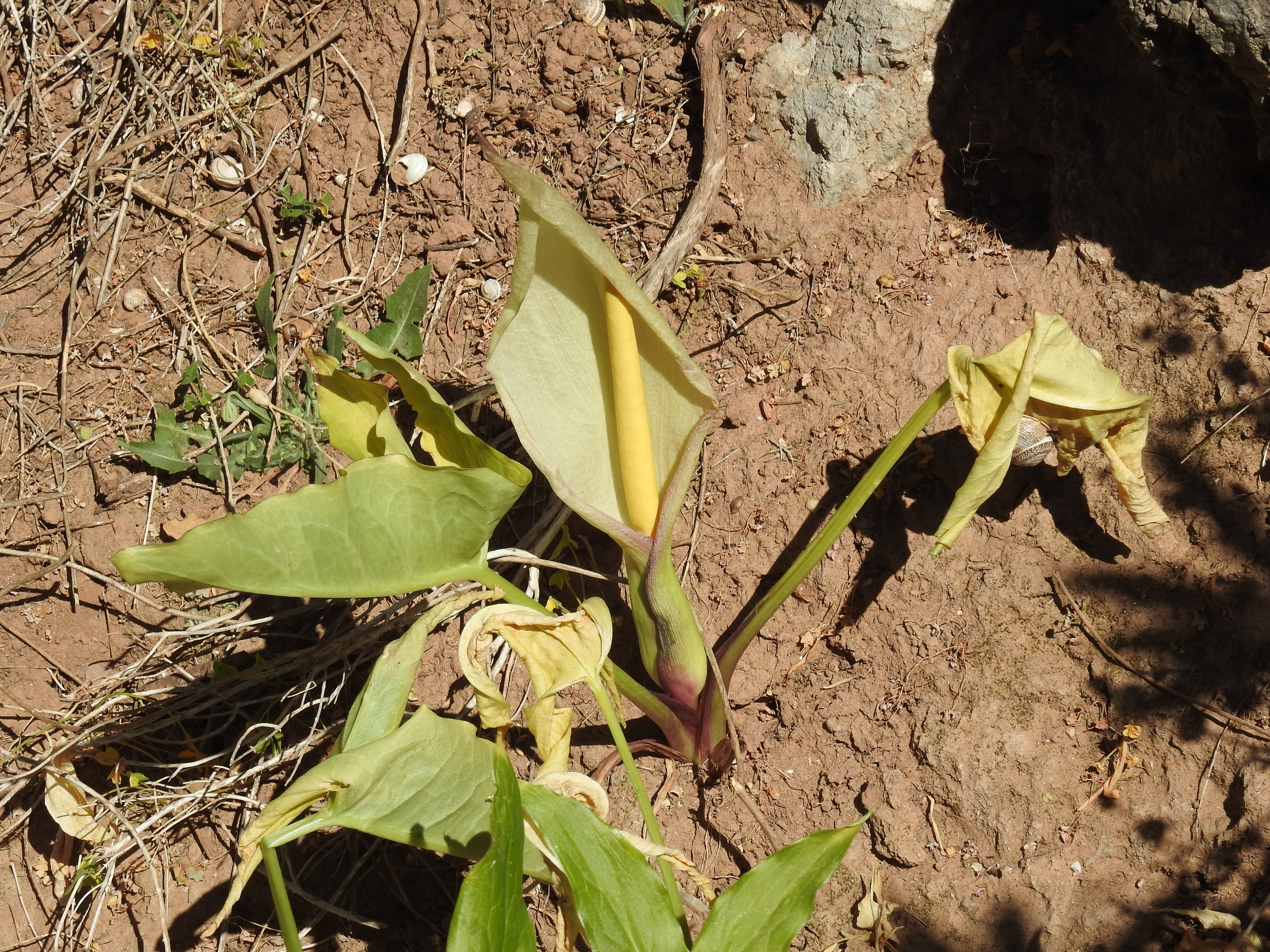
A. concinnatum

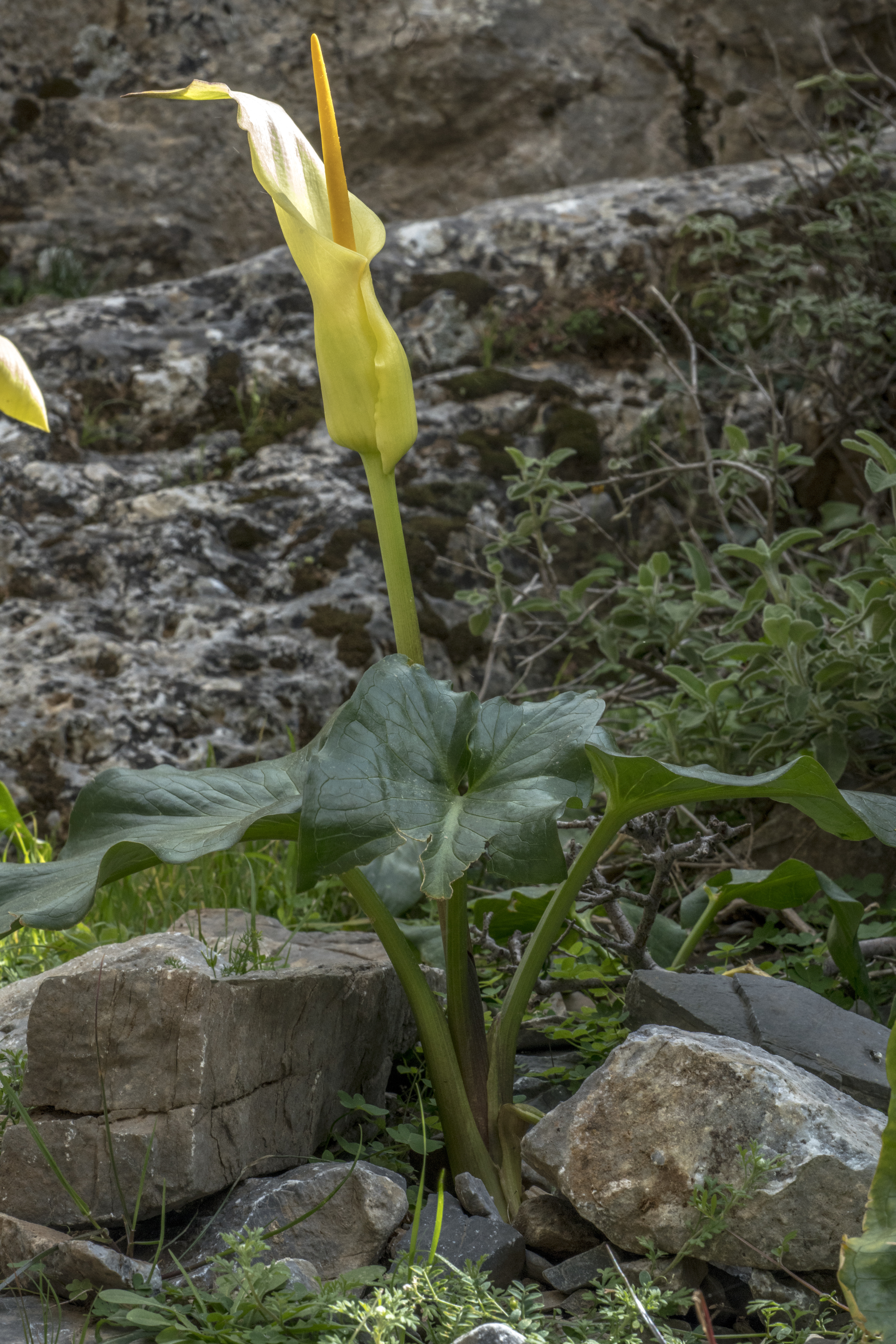
A. creticum

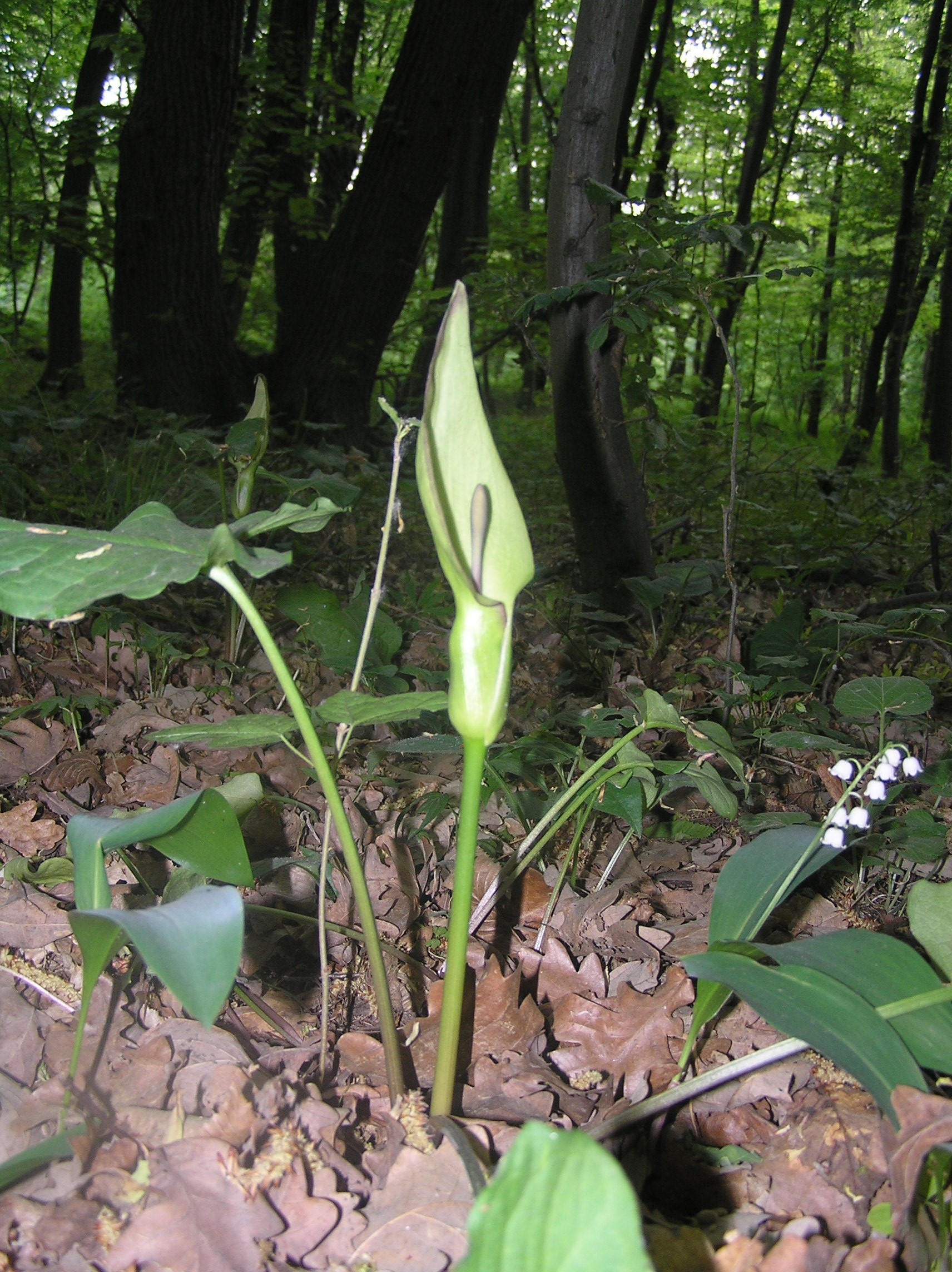
A. cylindraceum

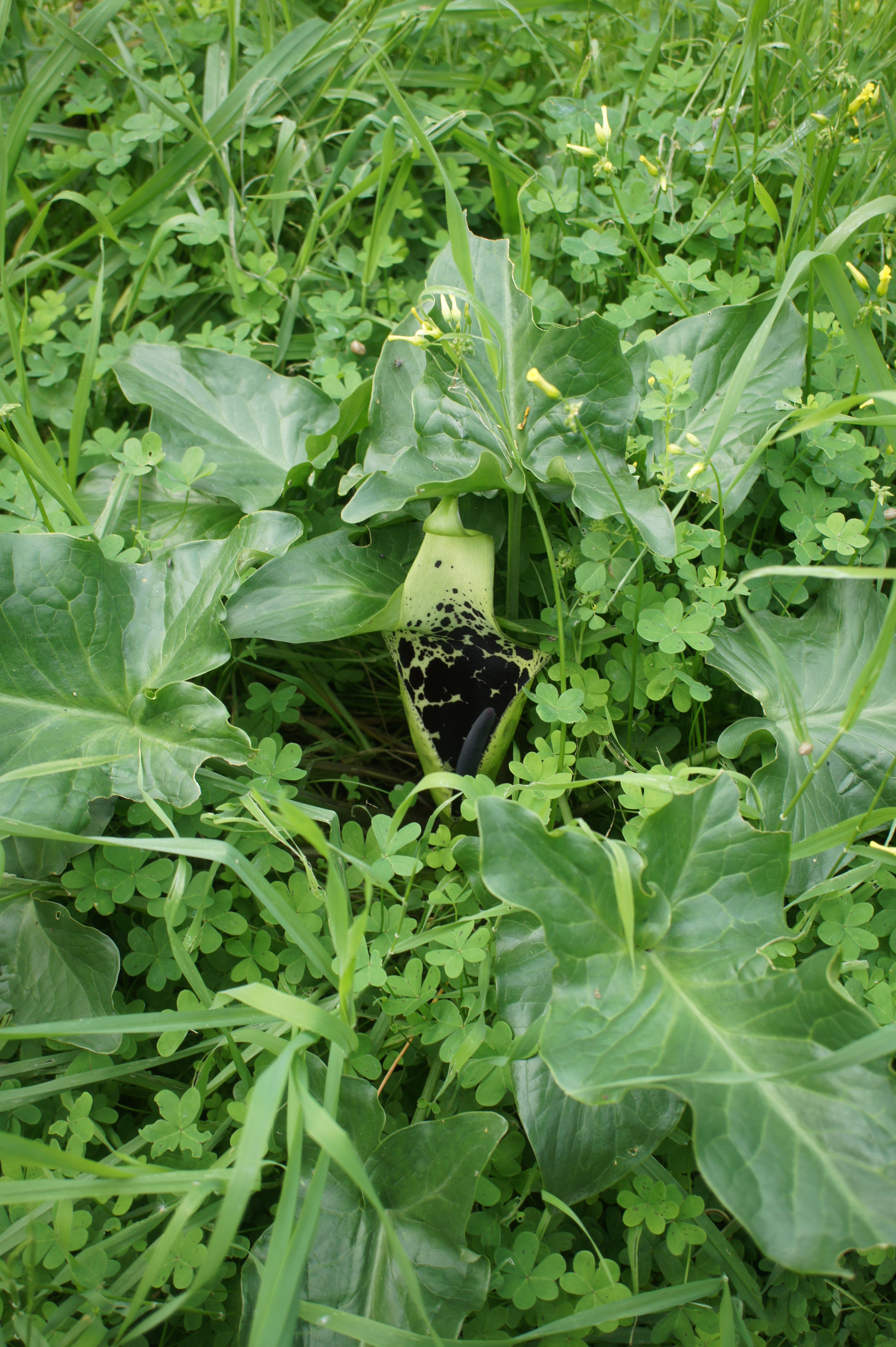
A. dioscoridis

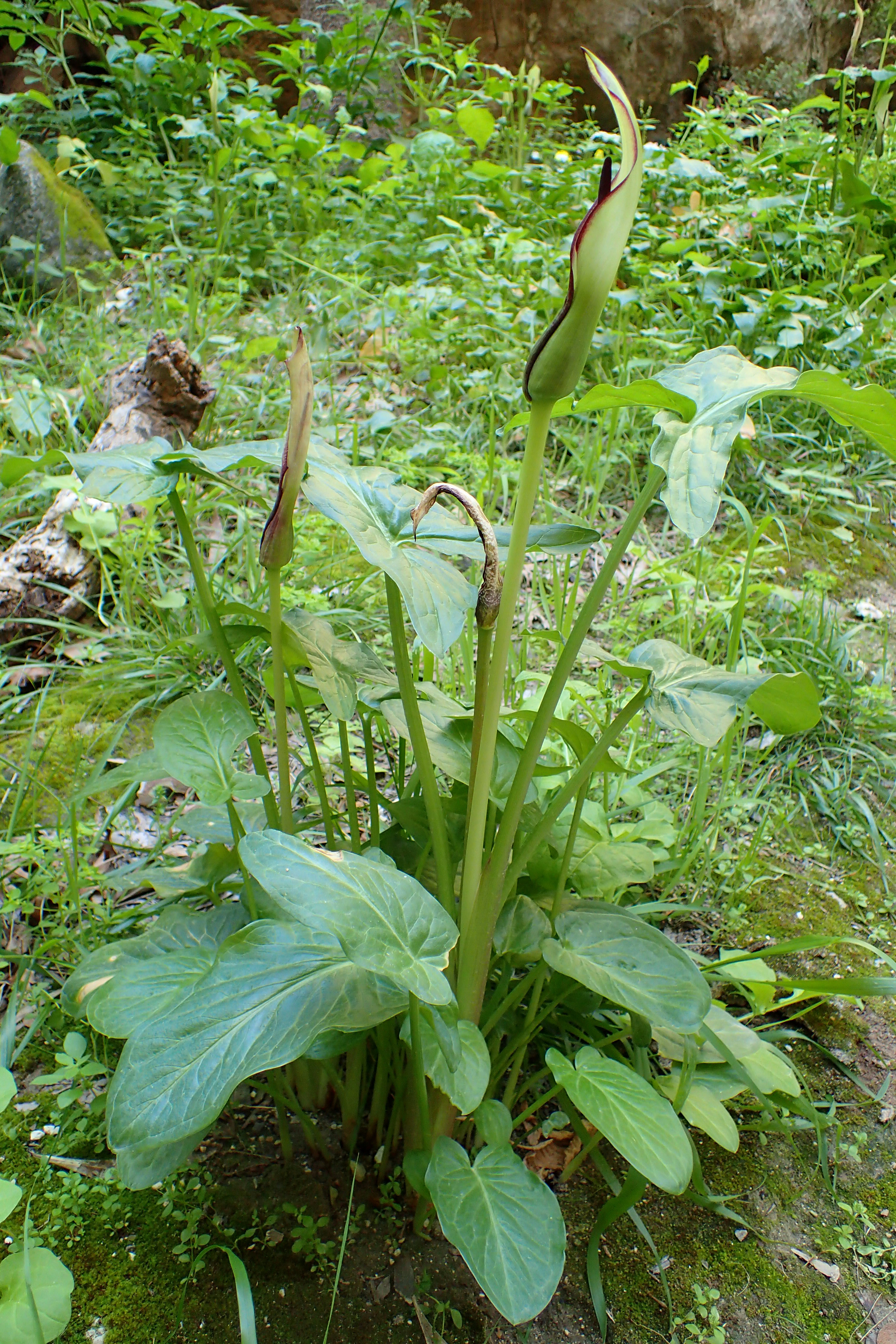
A. hygrophilum

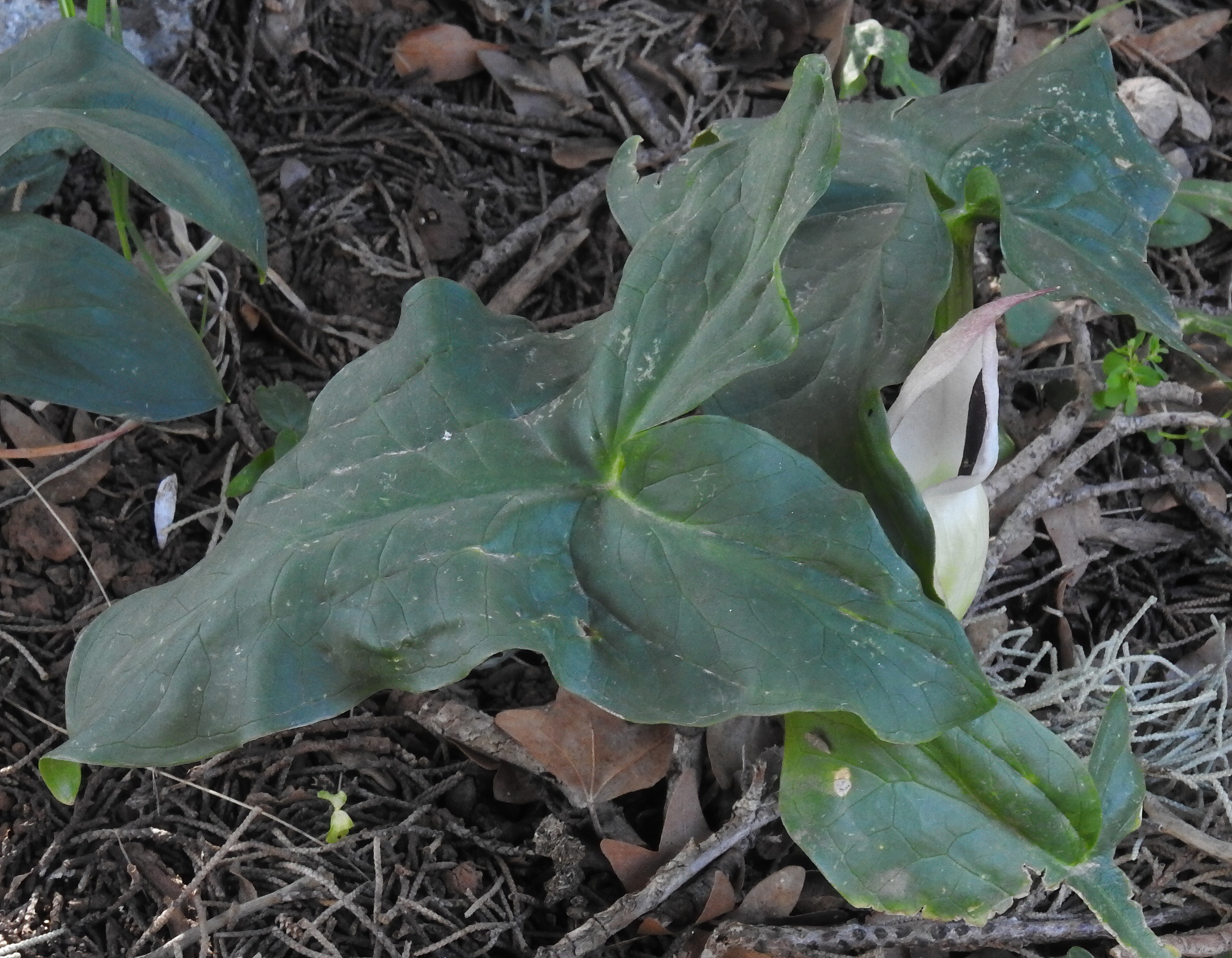
A. idaeum

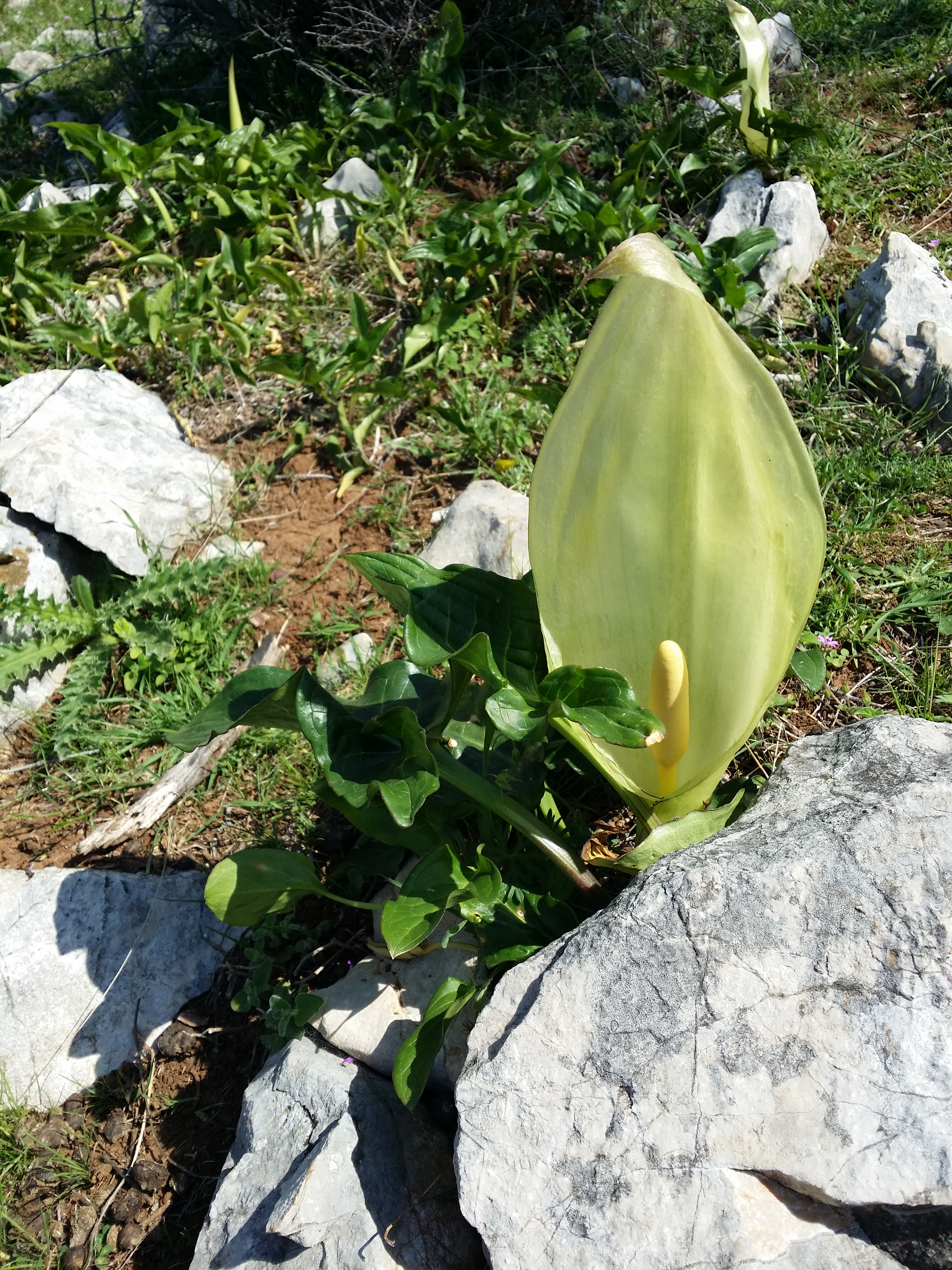
A. italicum

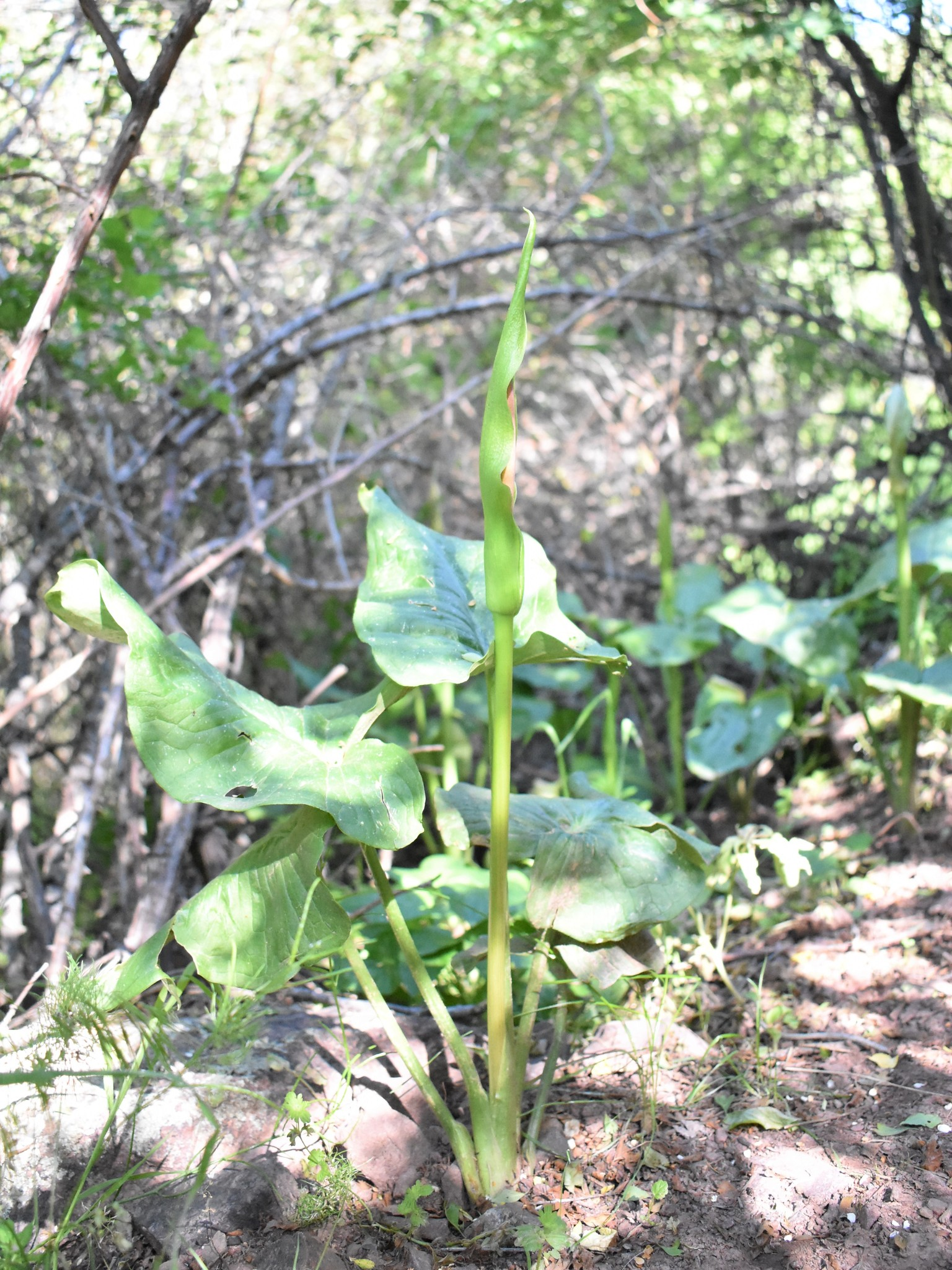
A. korolkowii

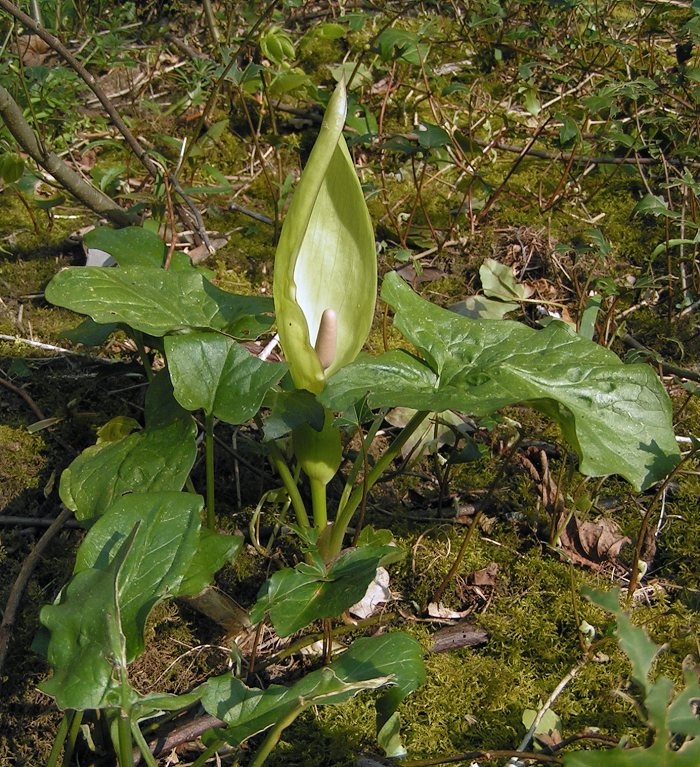
A. maculatum

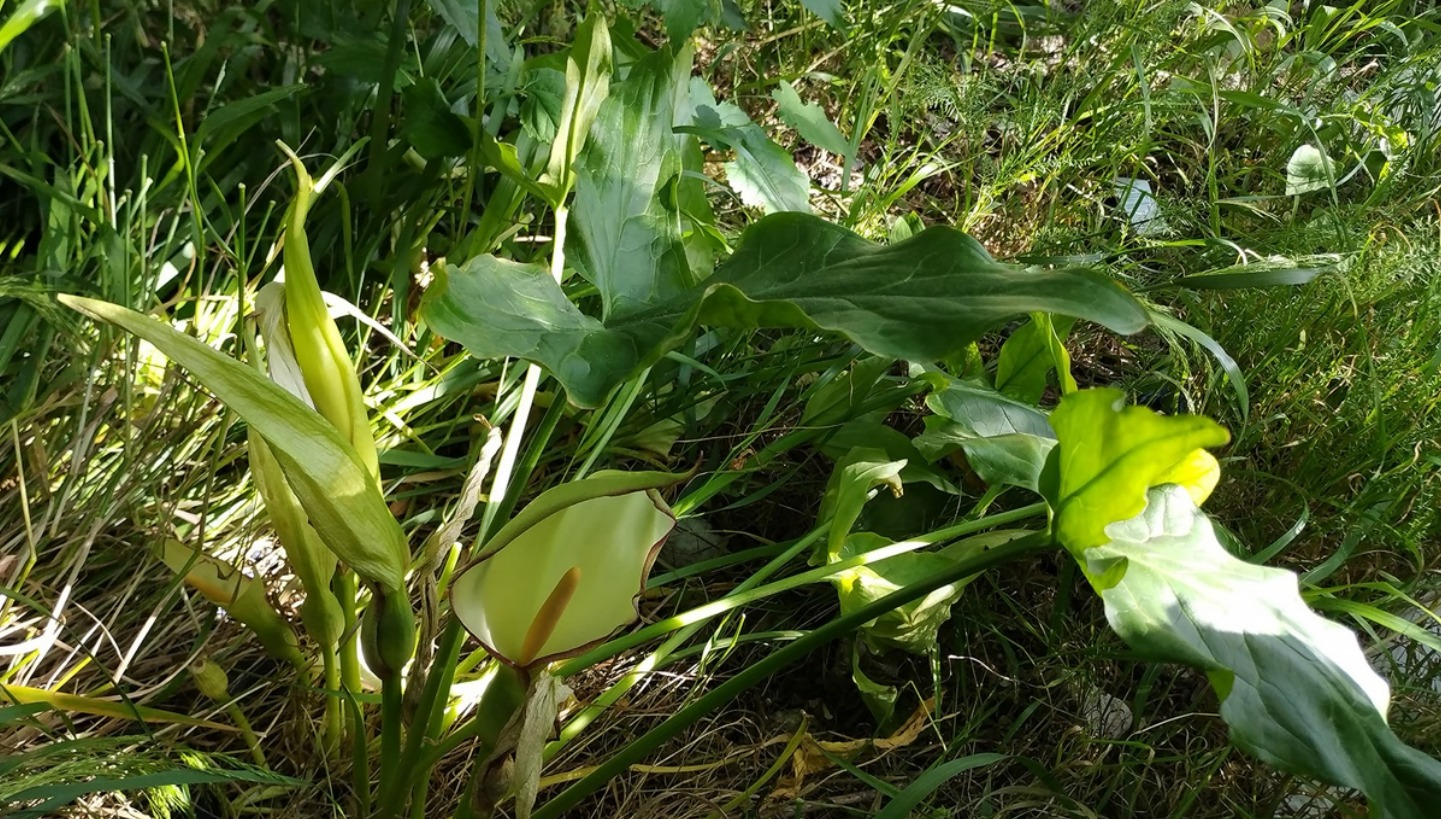
A. meryemianum

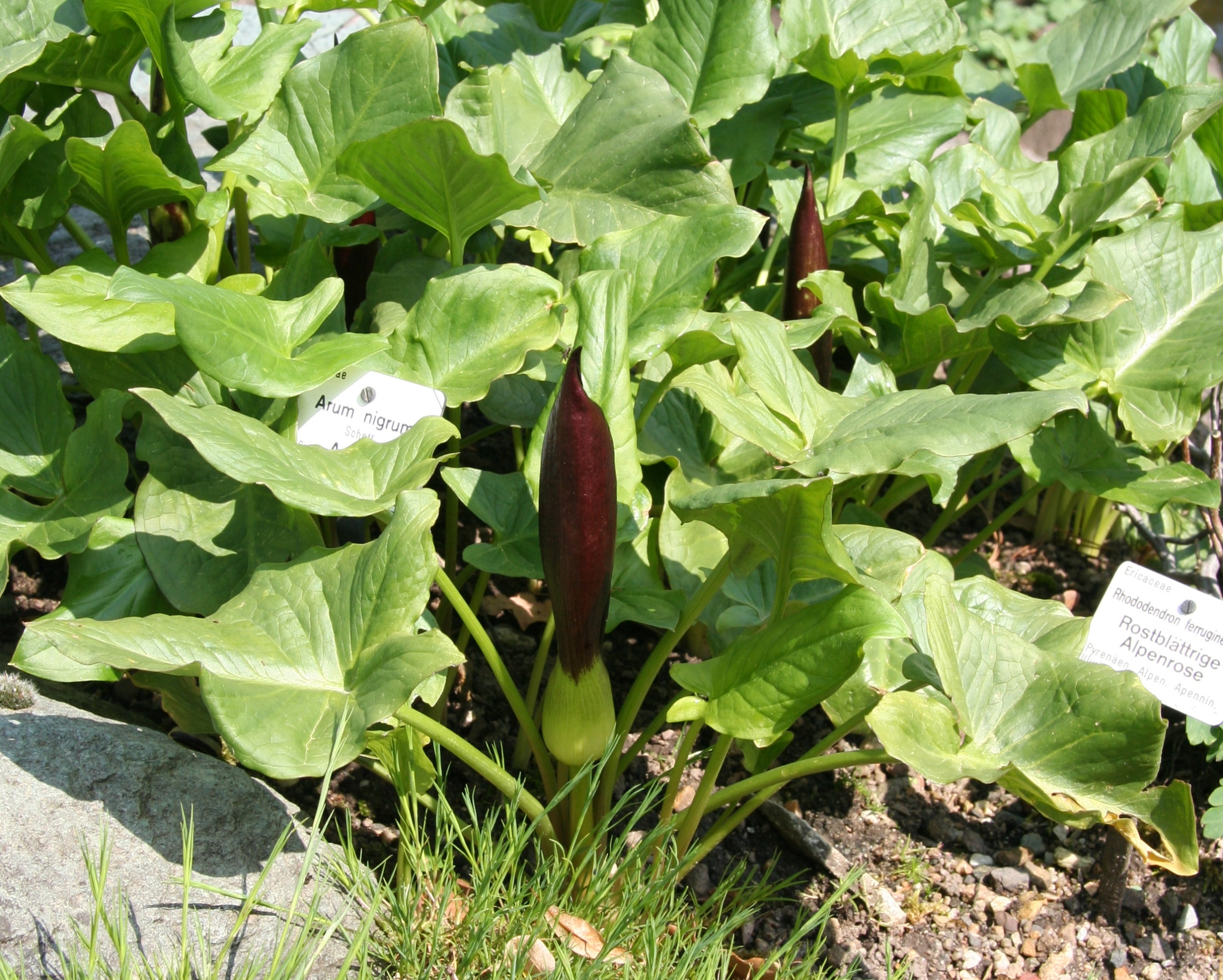
A. nigrum

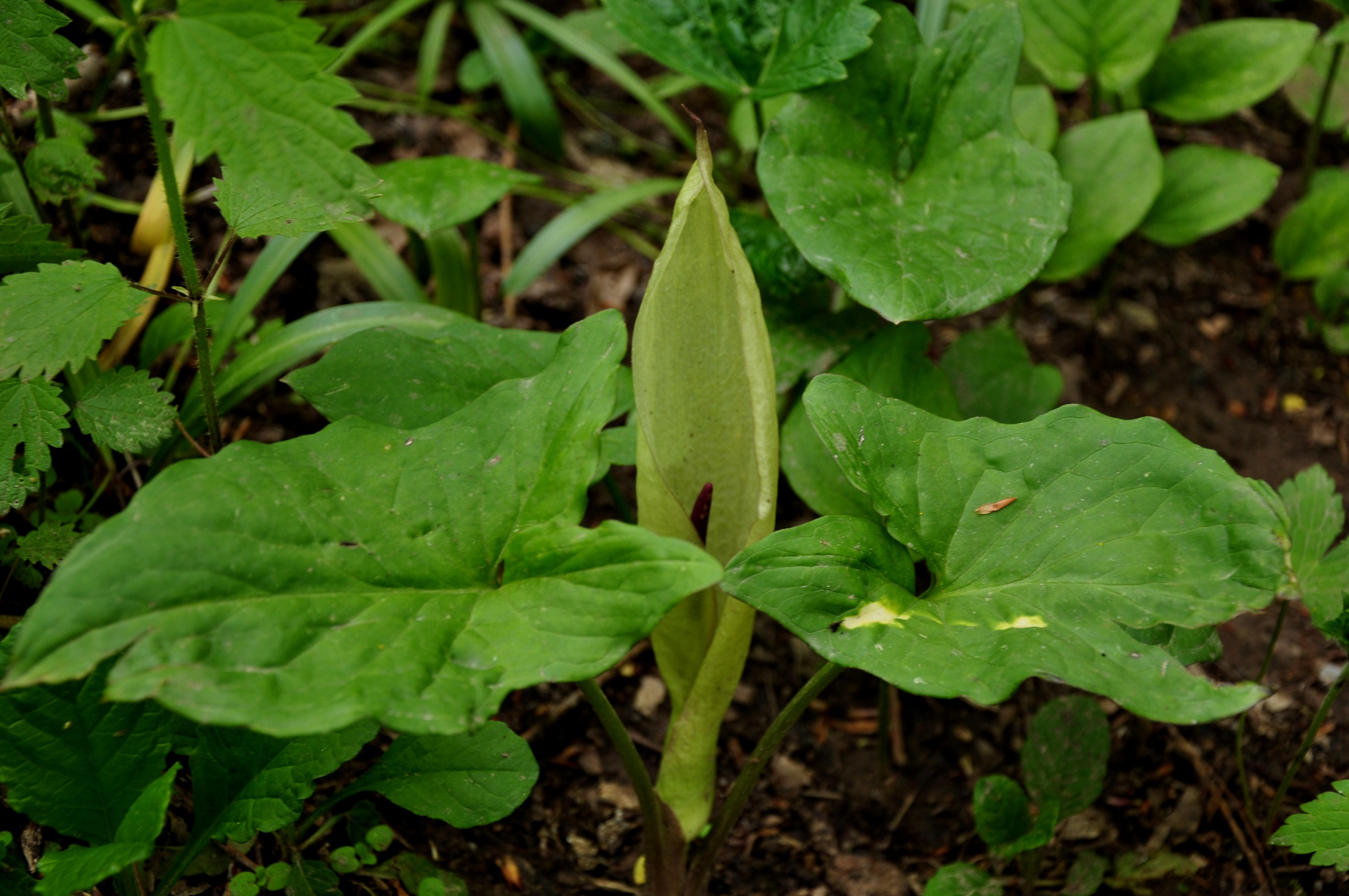
A. orientale

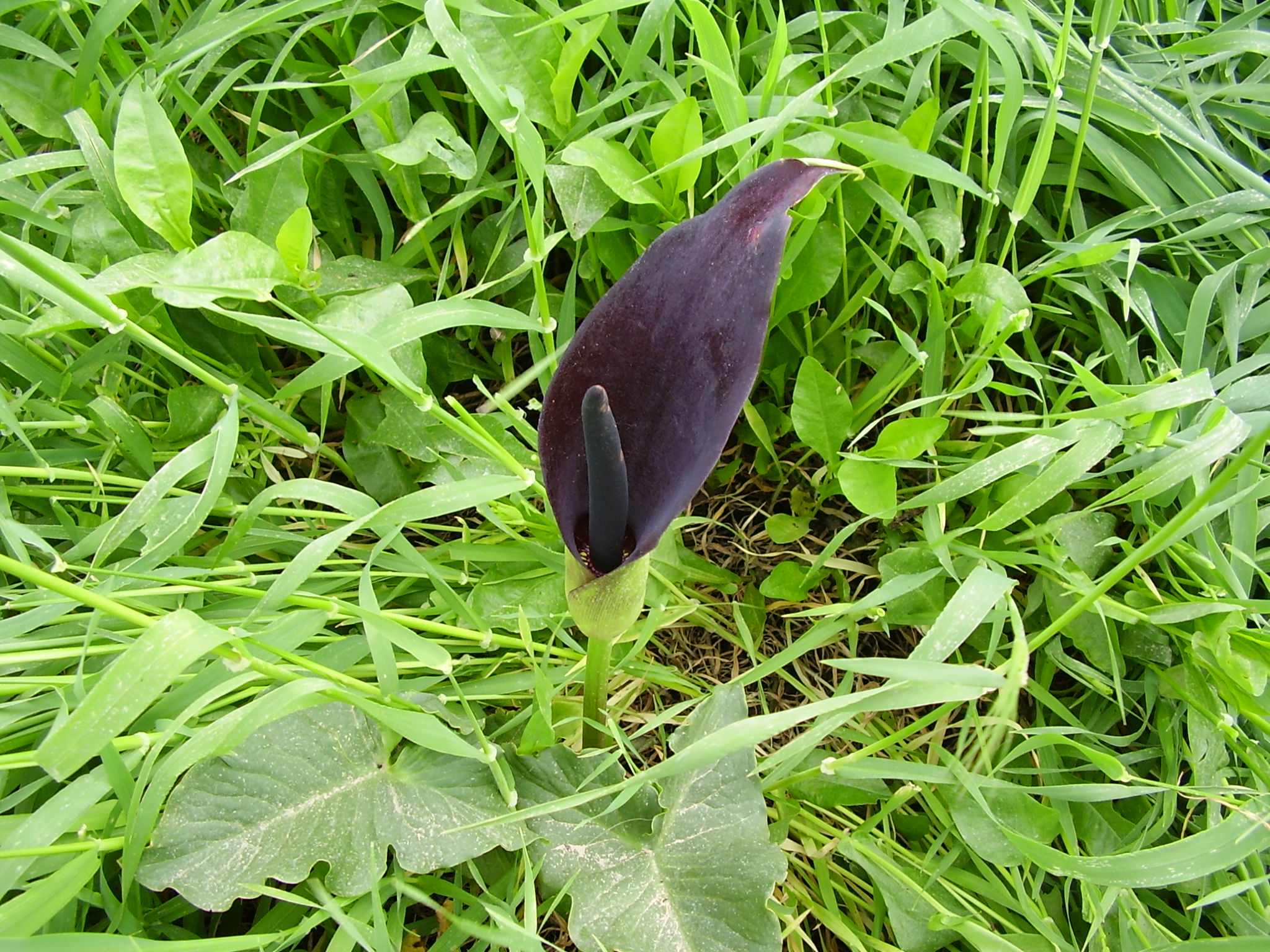
A. palaestinum

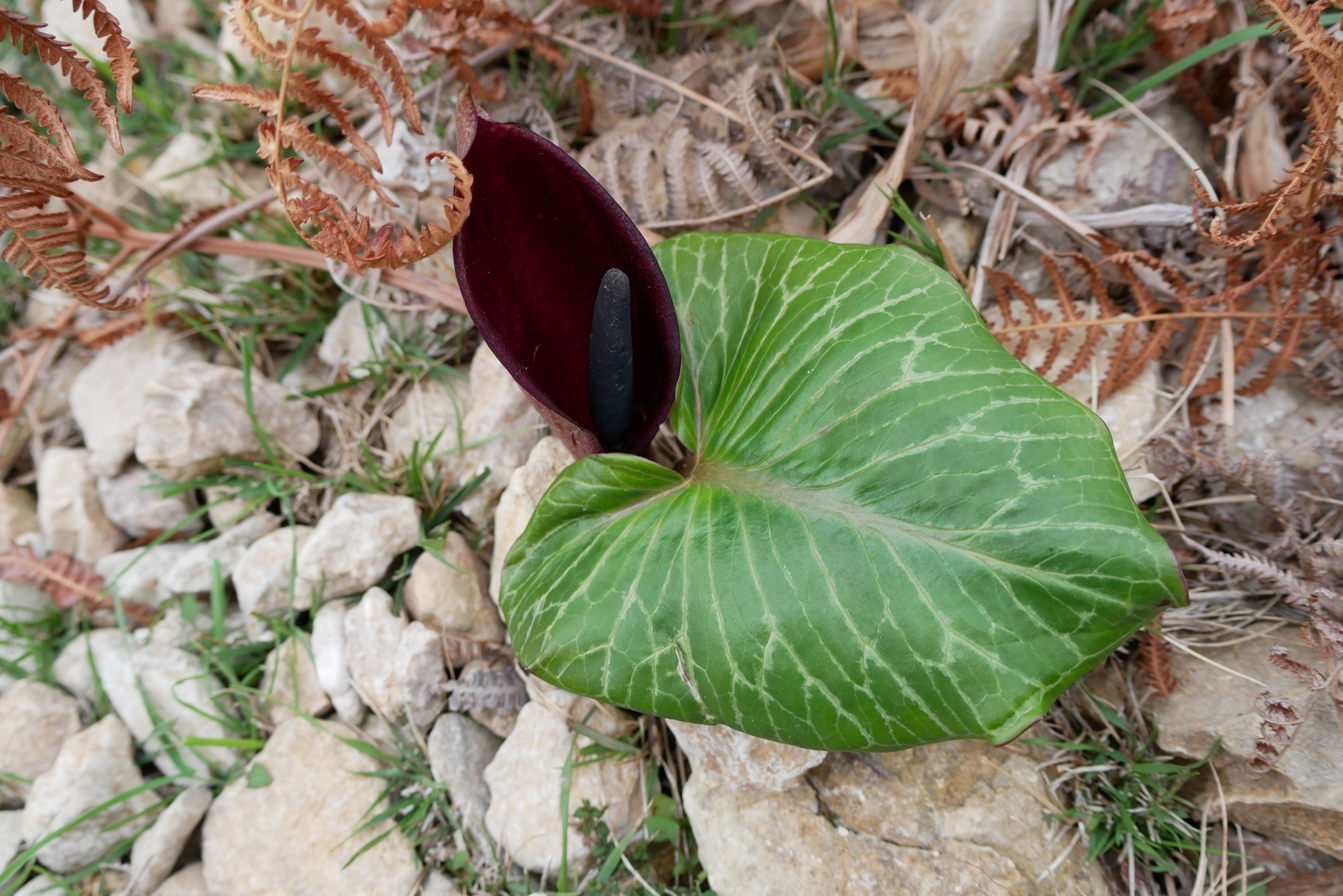
A. pictum

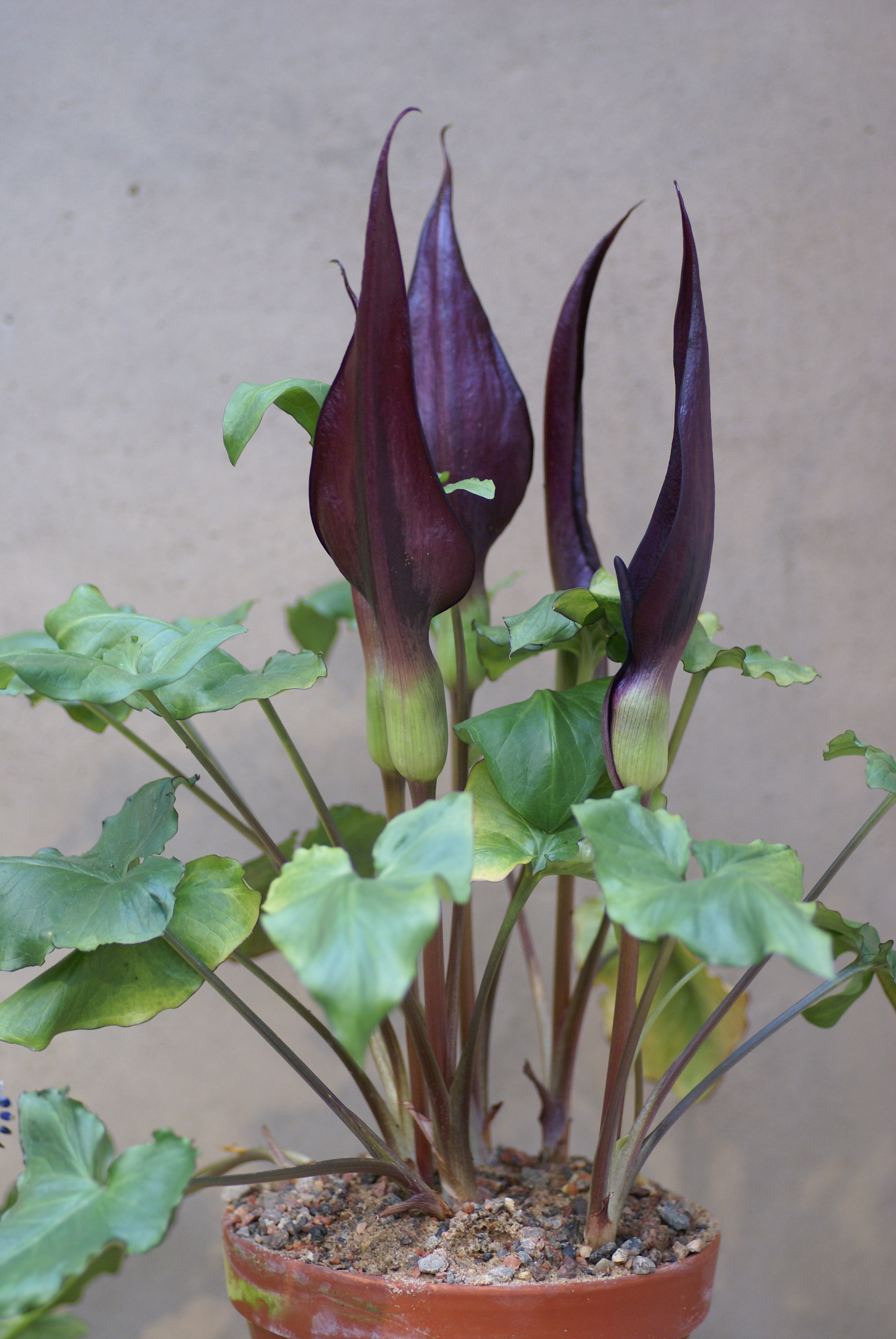
A. purpureospathum

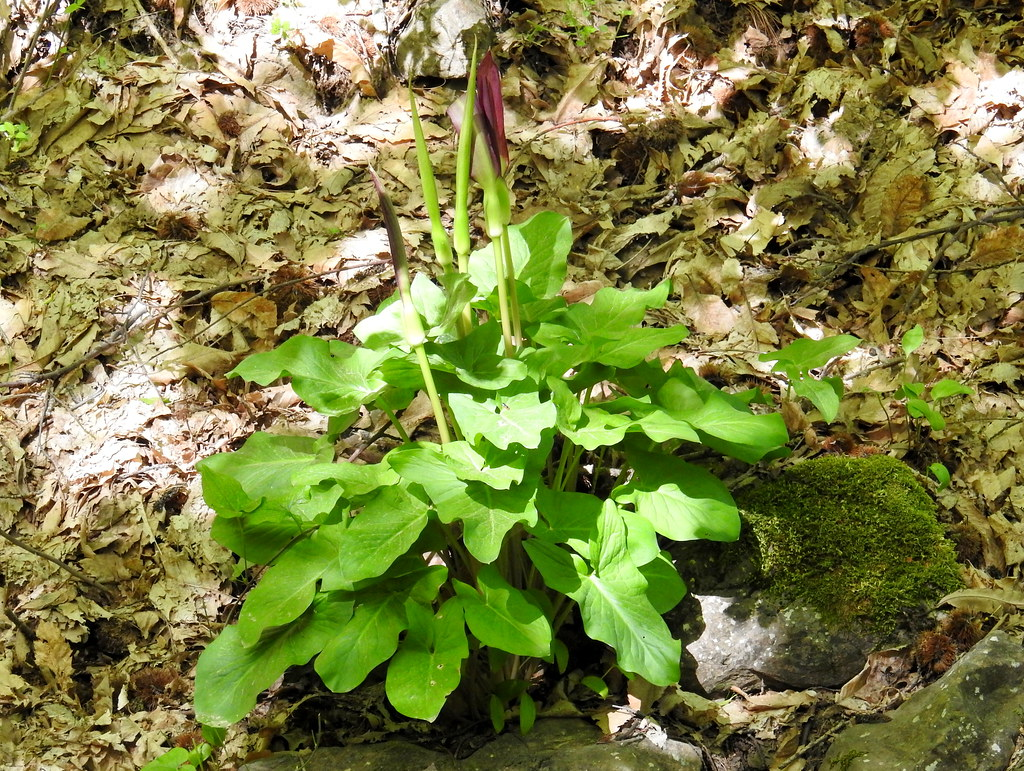
A. rupicola

=== Flower ===
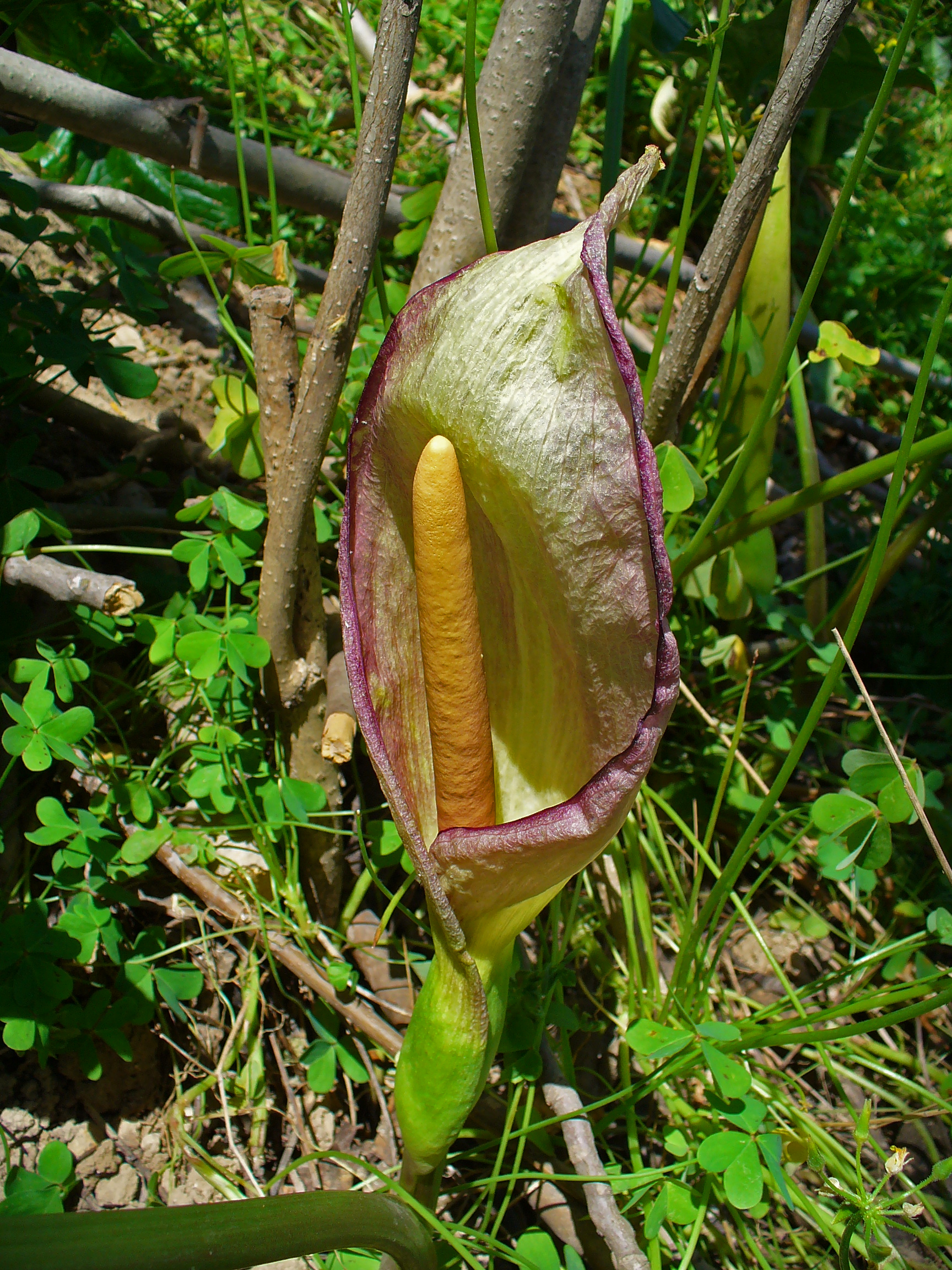
A. concinnatum

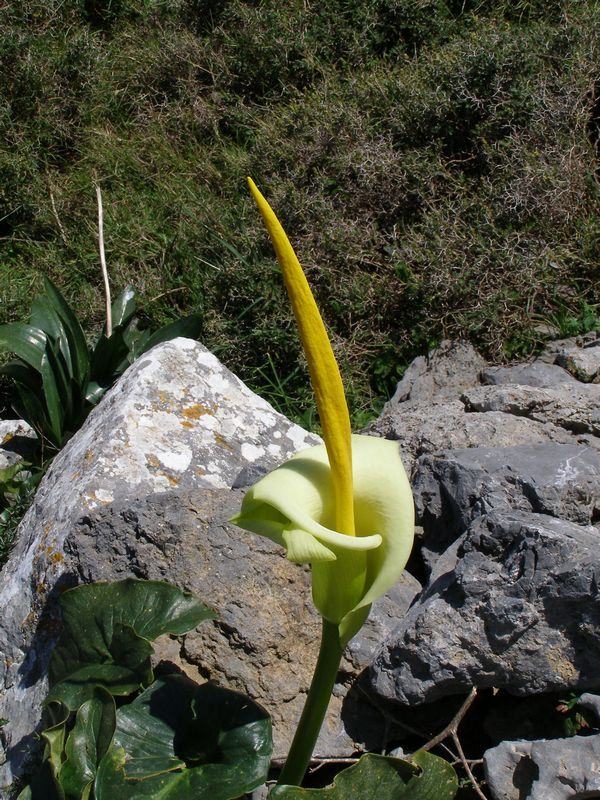
A. creticum

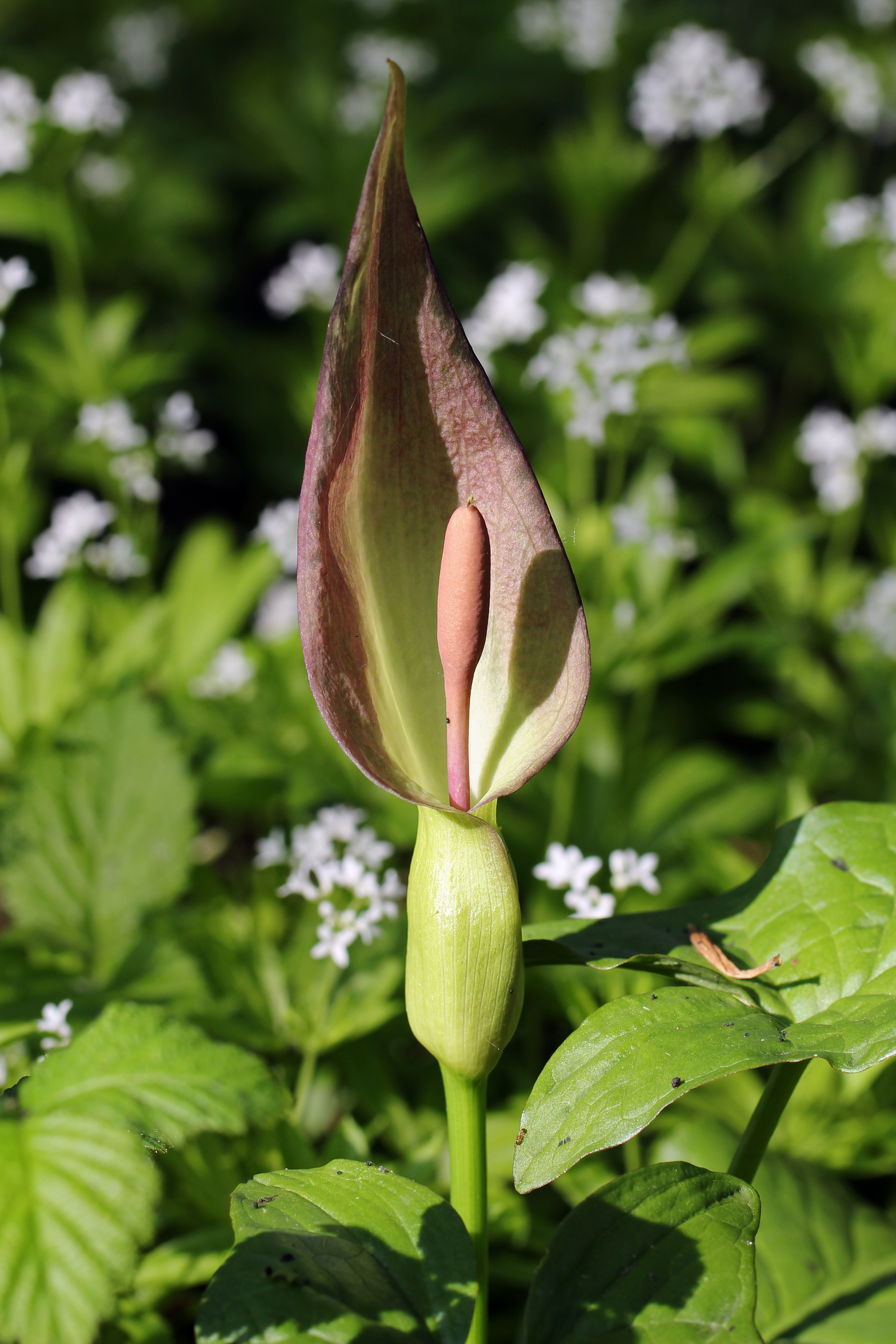
A. cylindraceum

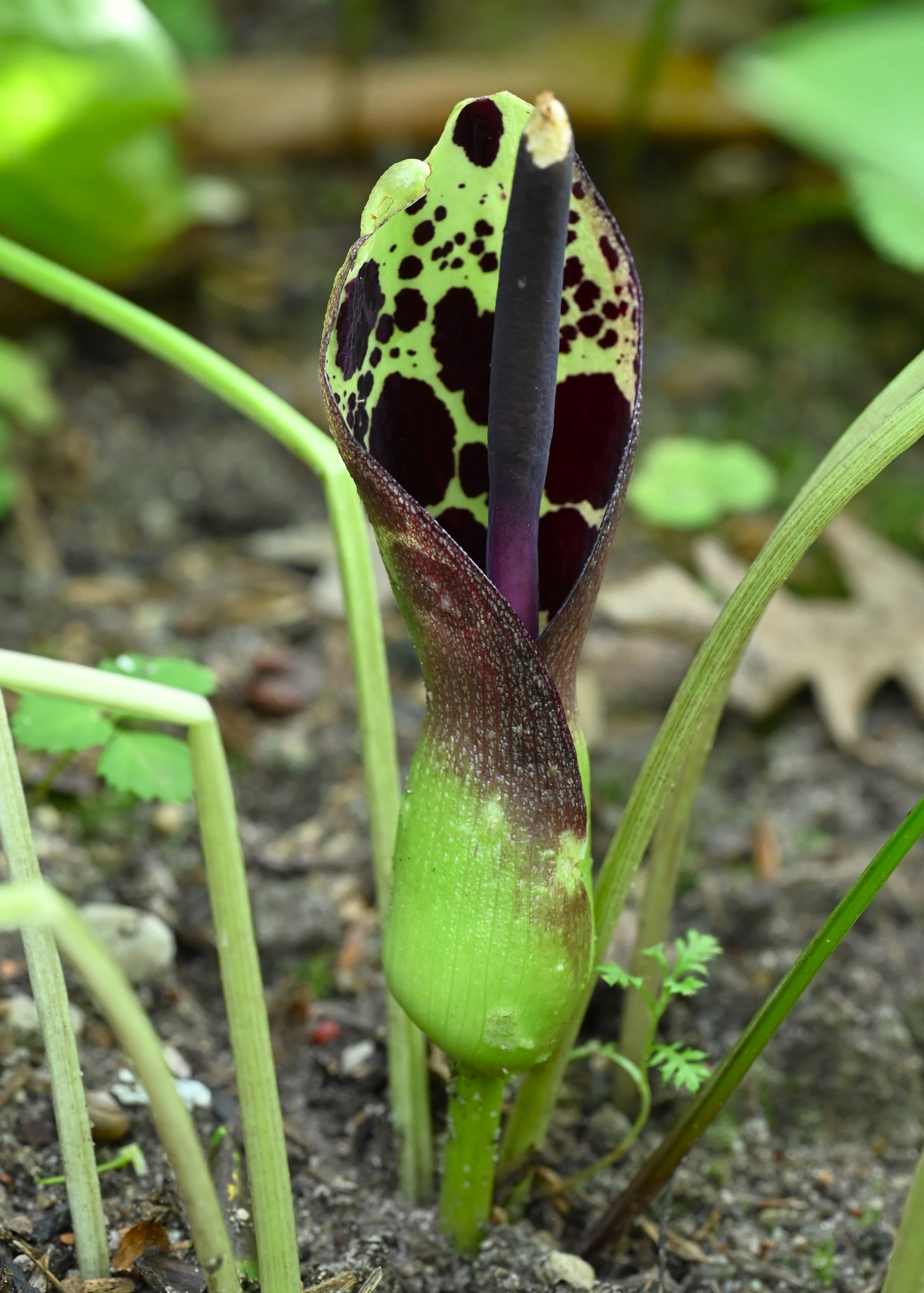
A. dioscoridis

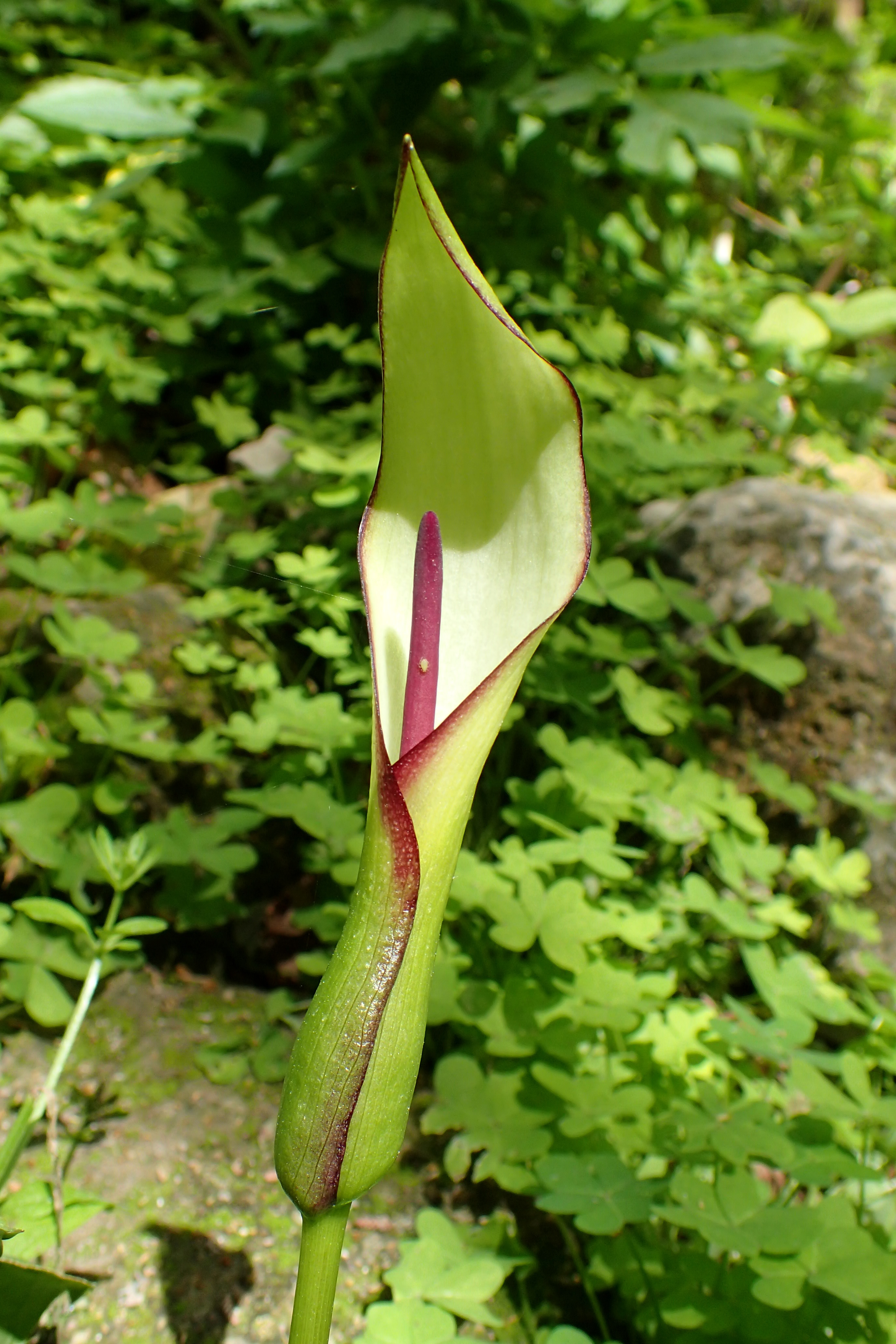
A. hygrophilum

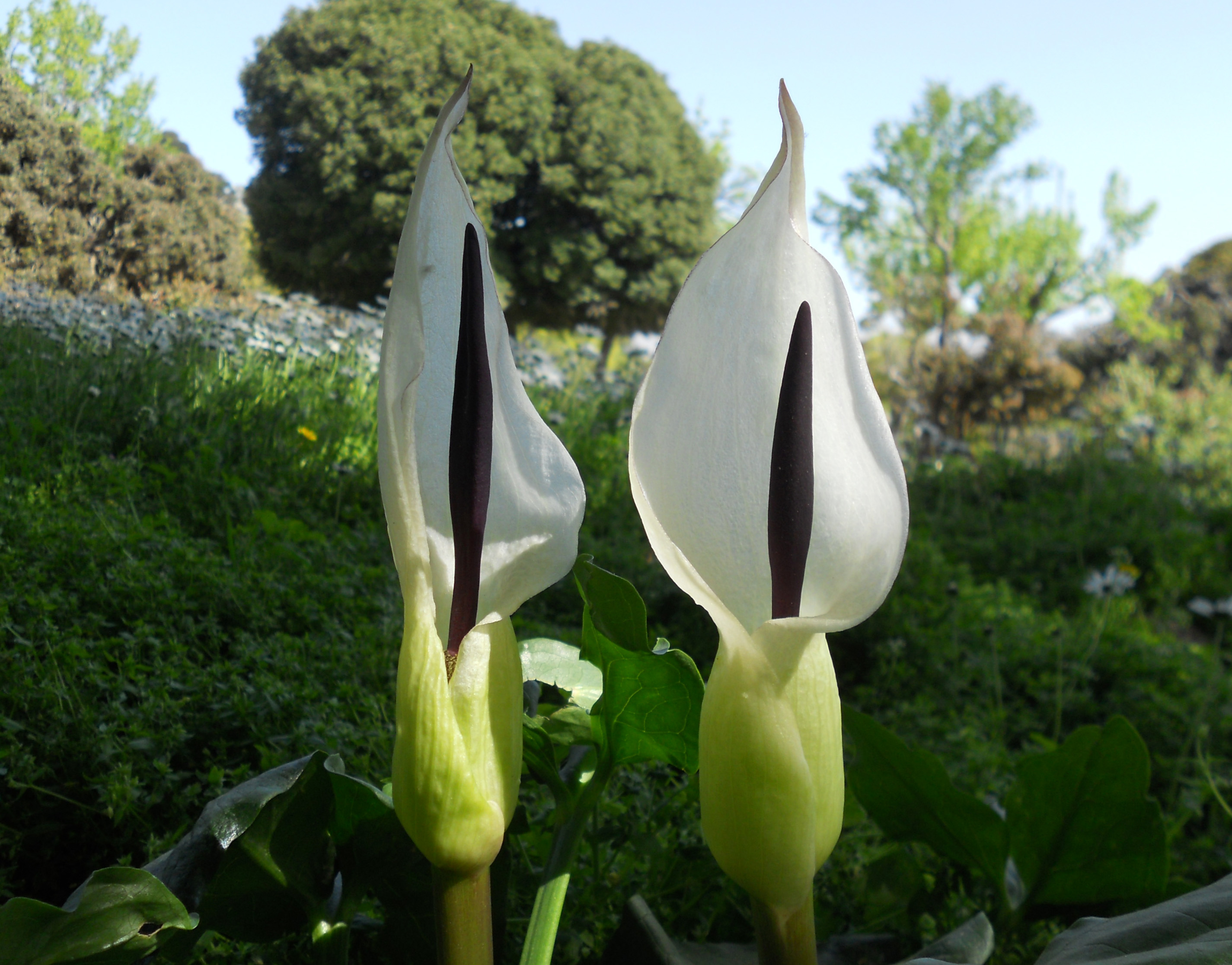
A. idaeum

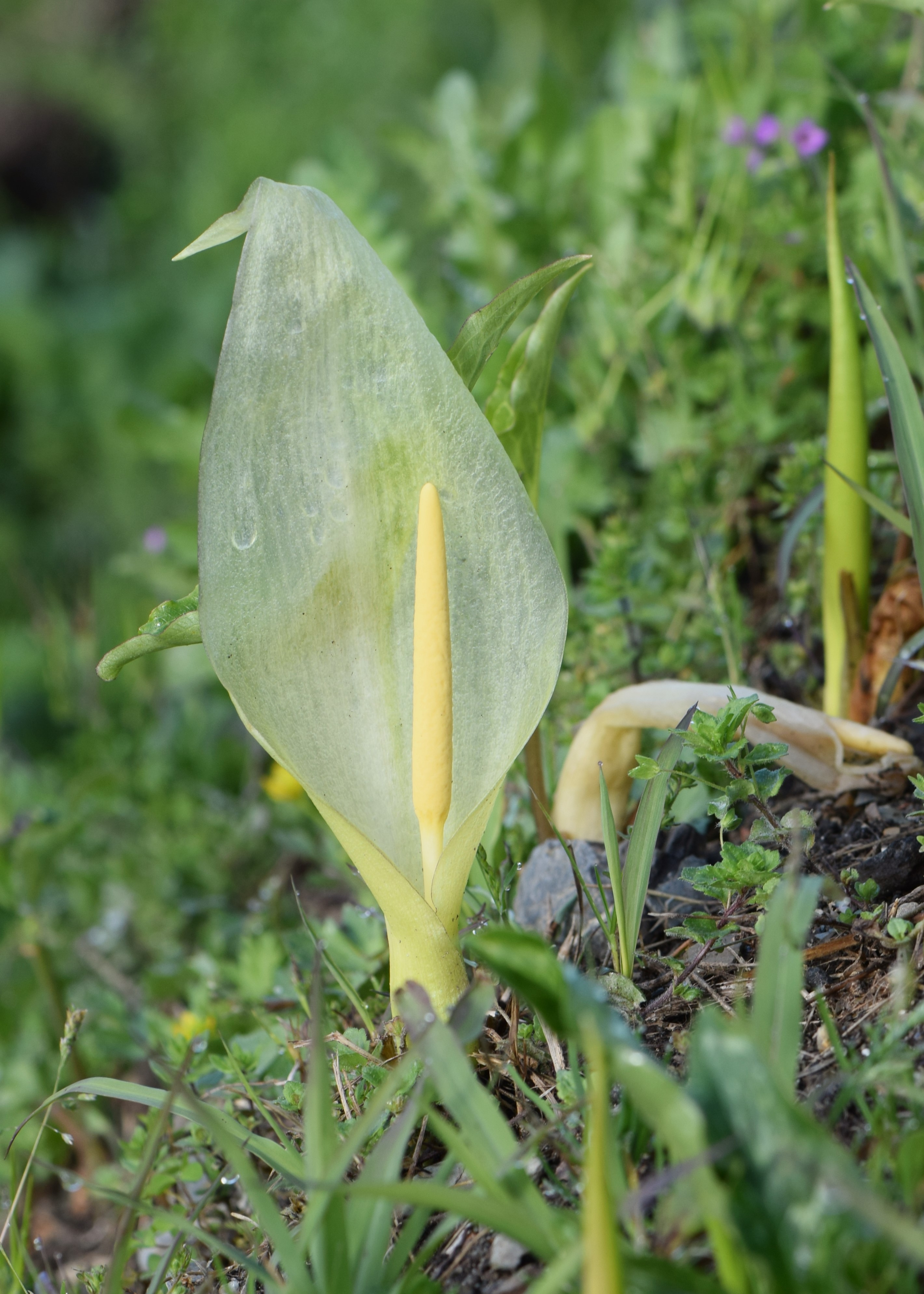
A. italicum

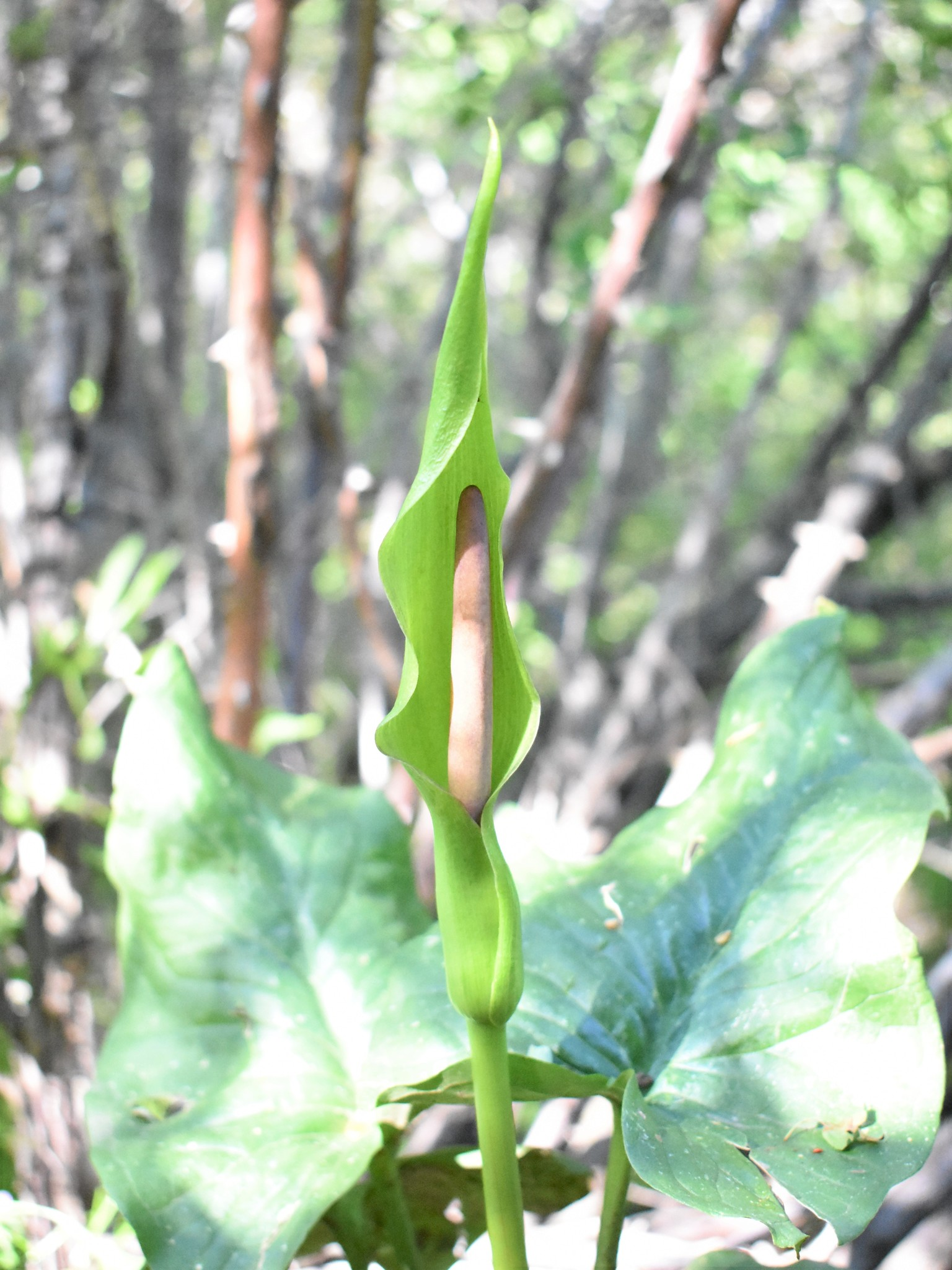
A. korolkowii

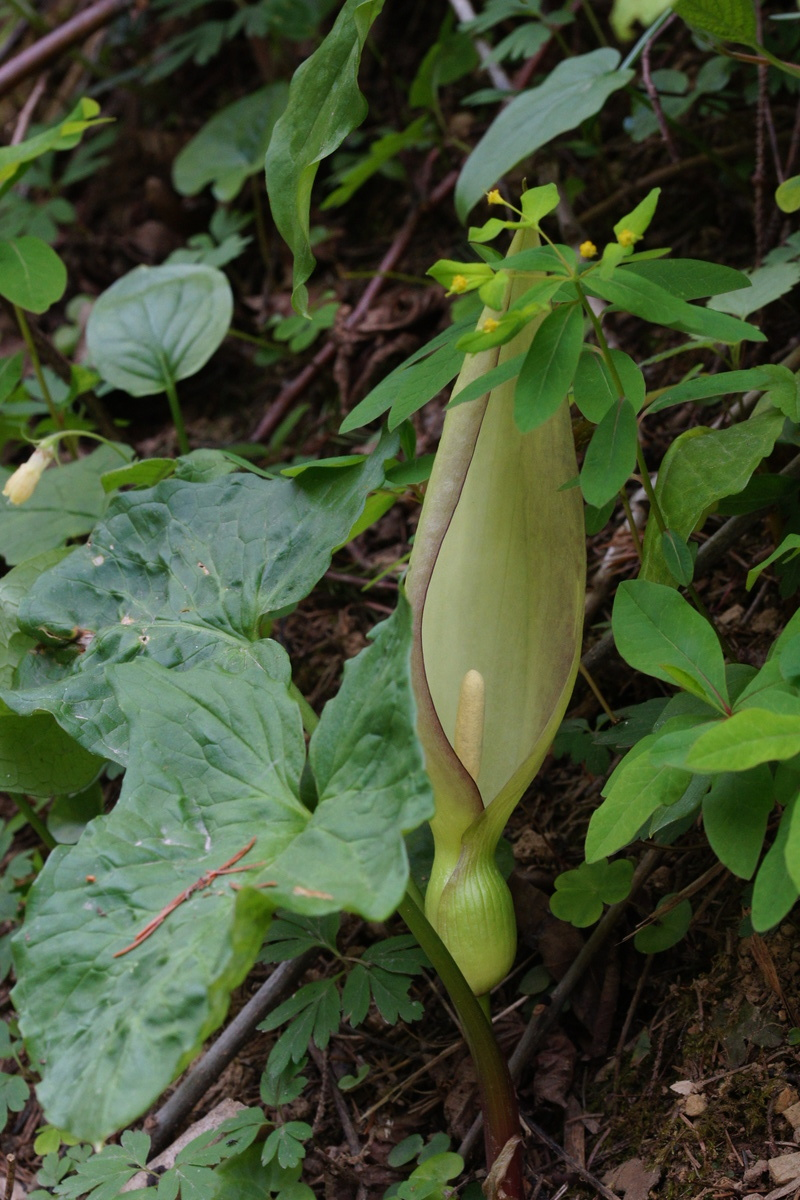
A. maculatum

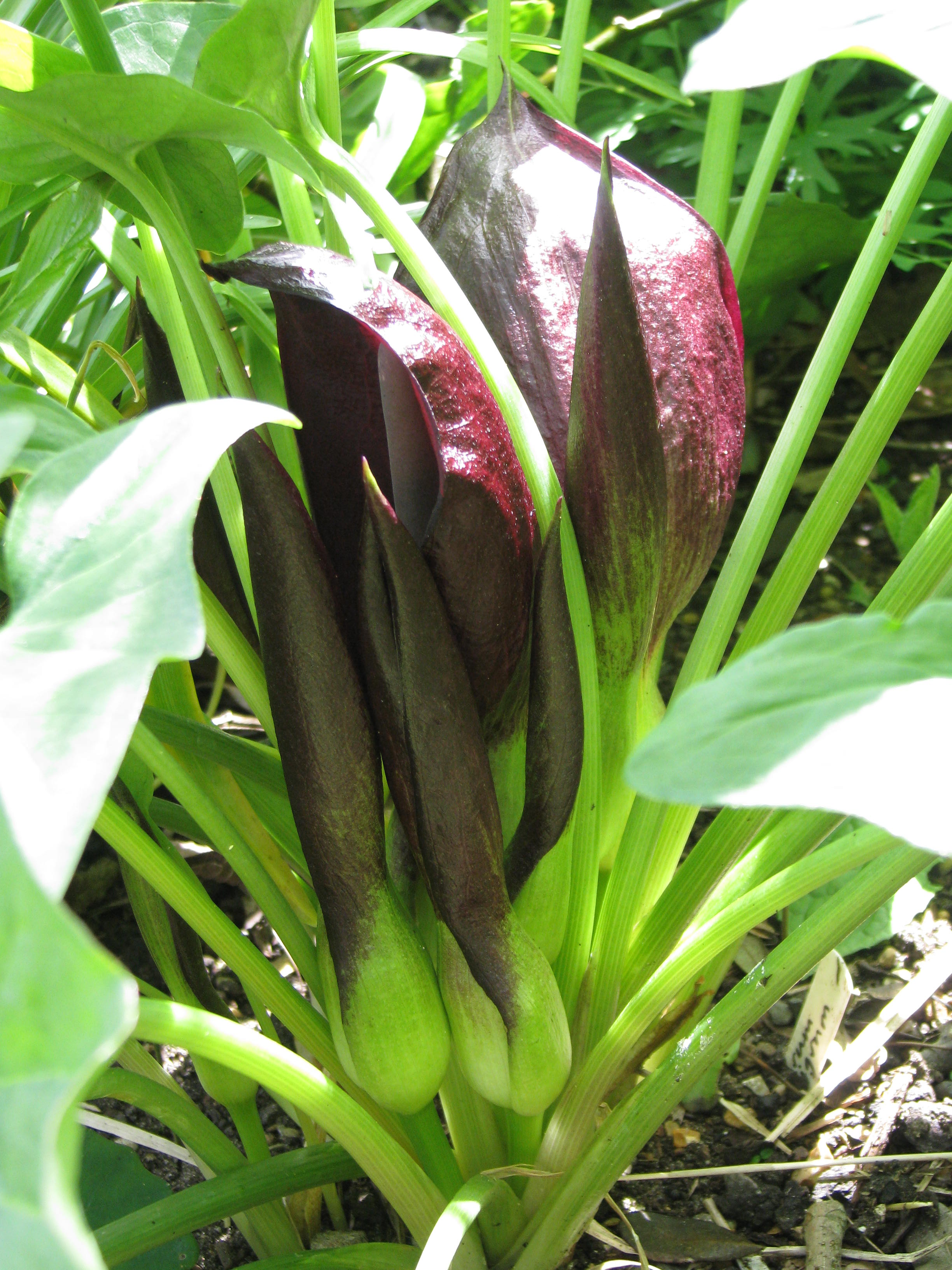
A. nigrum

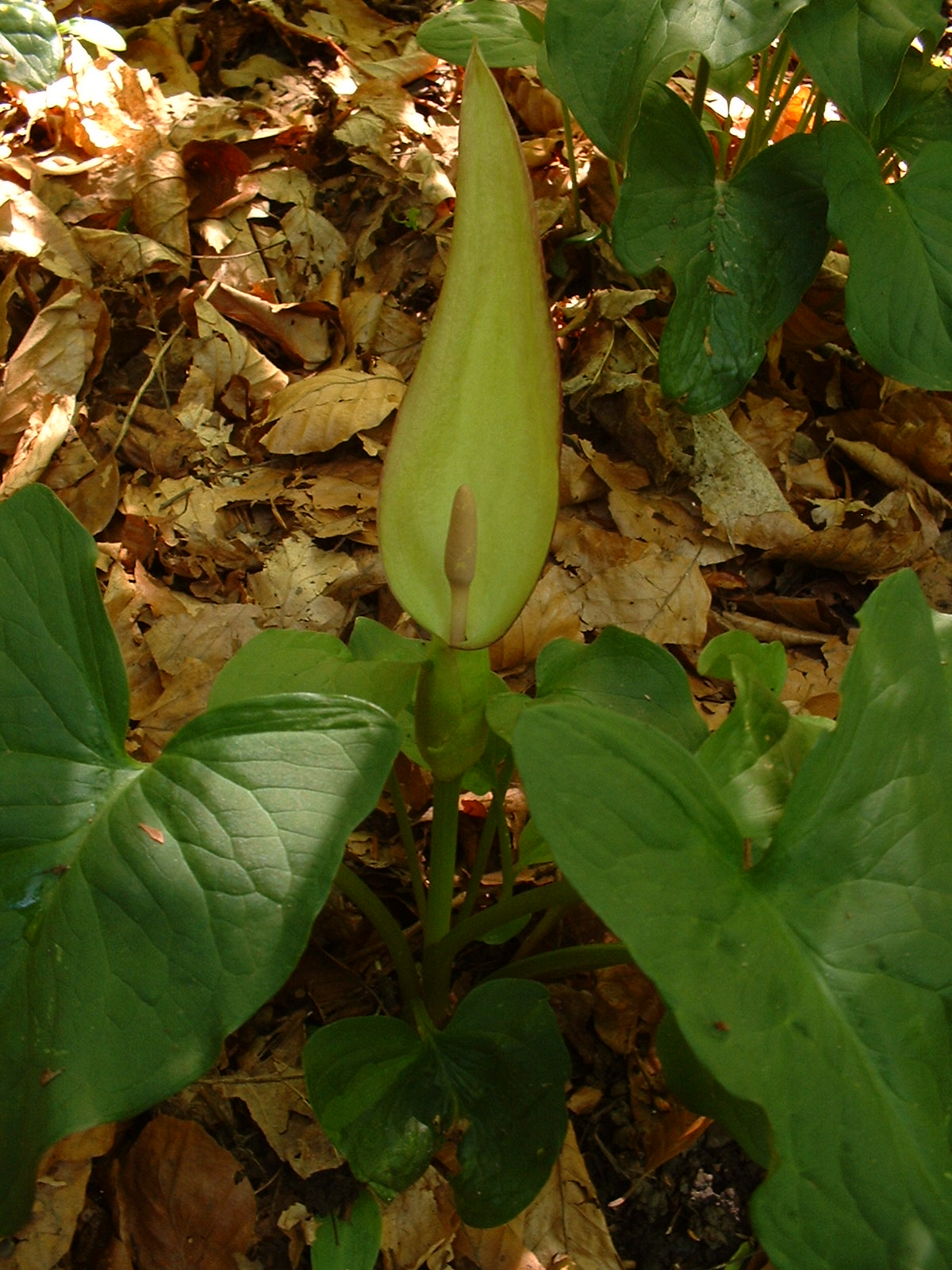
A. orientale

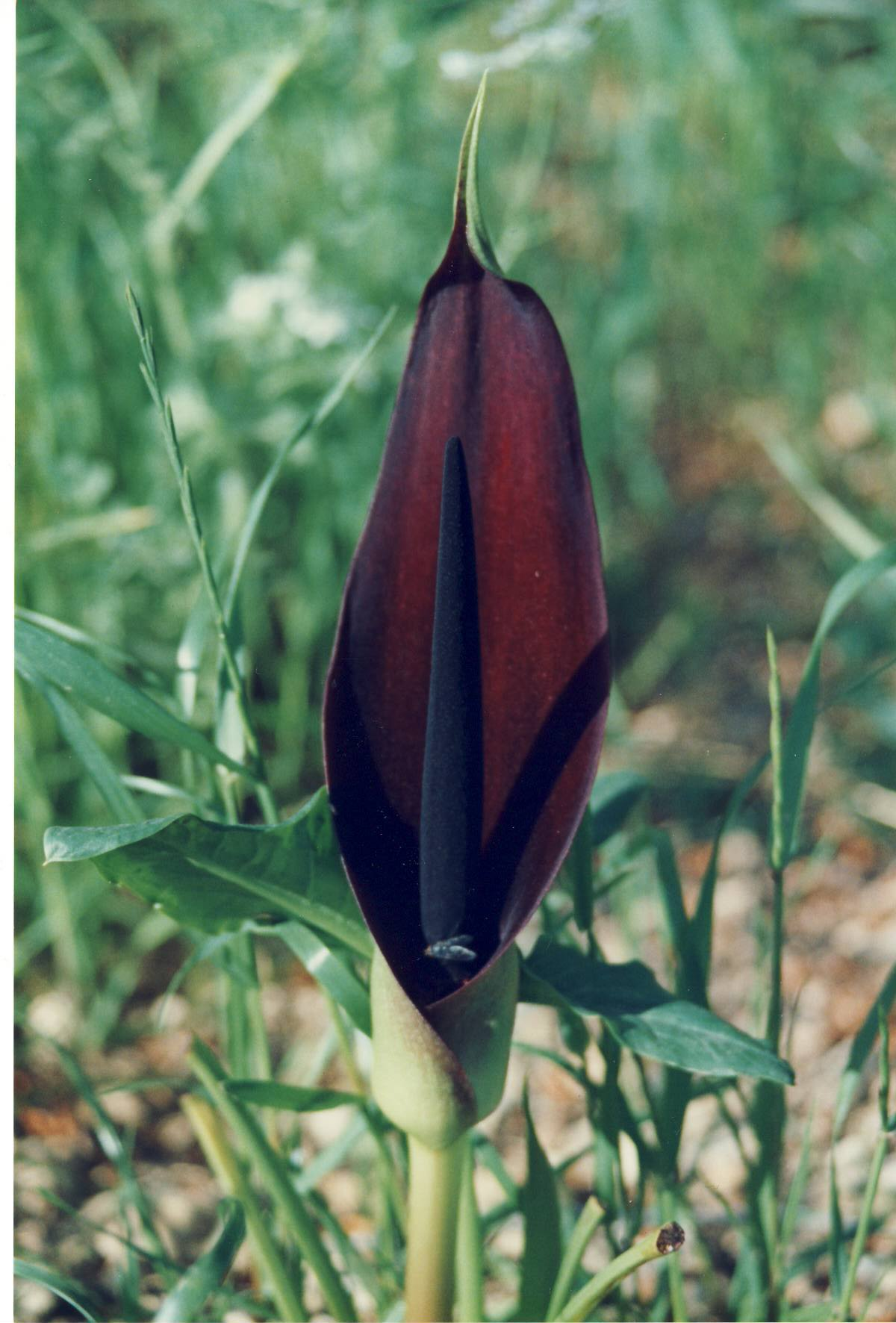
A. palaestinum

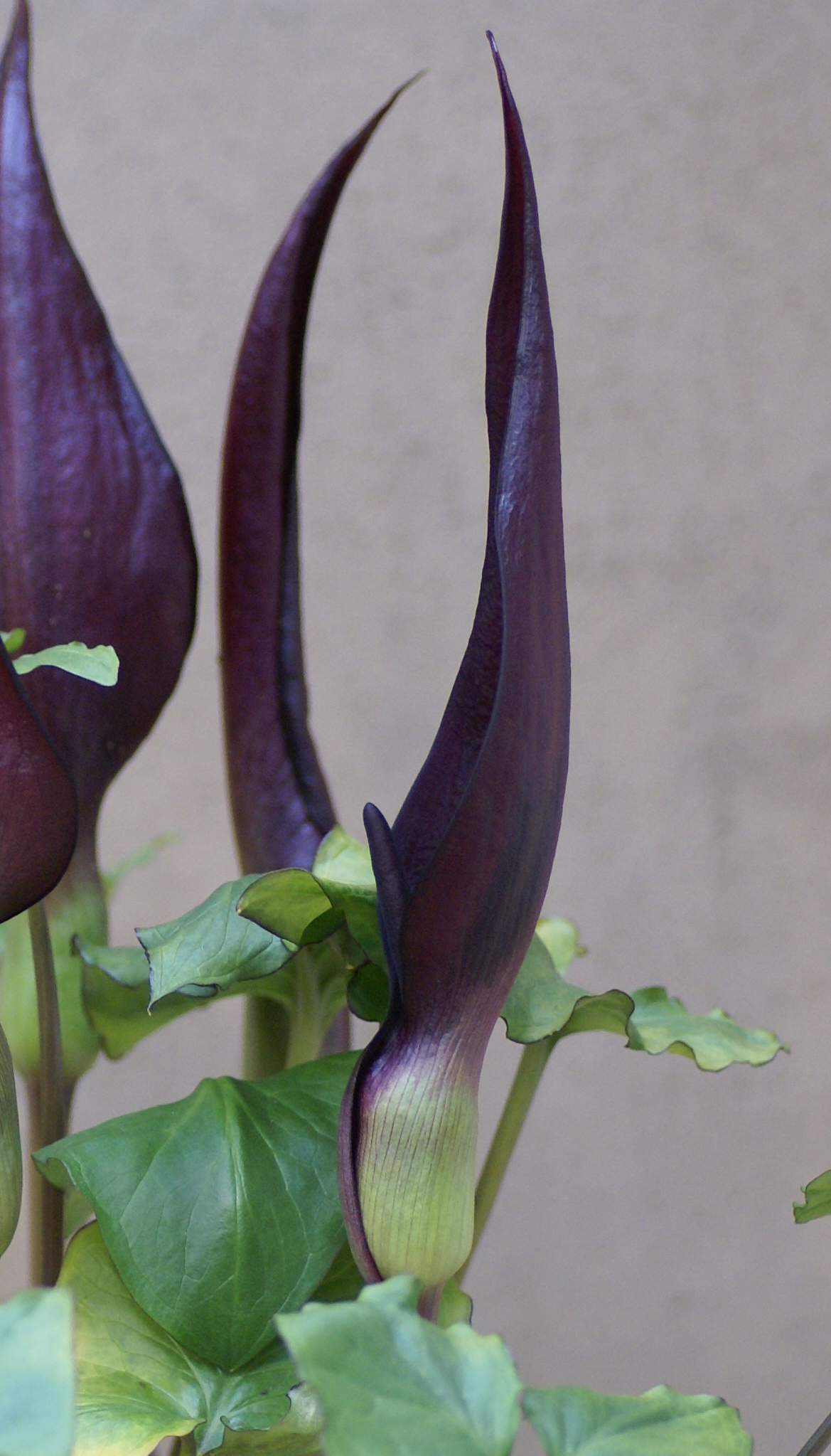
A. purpureospathum

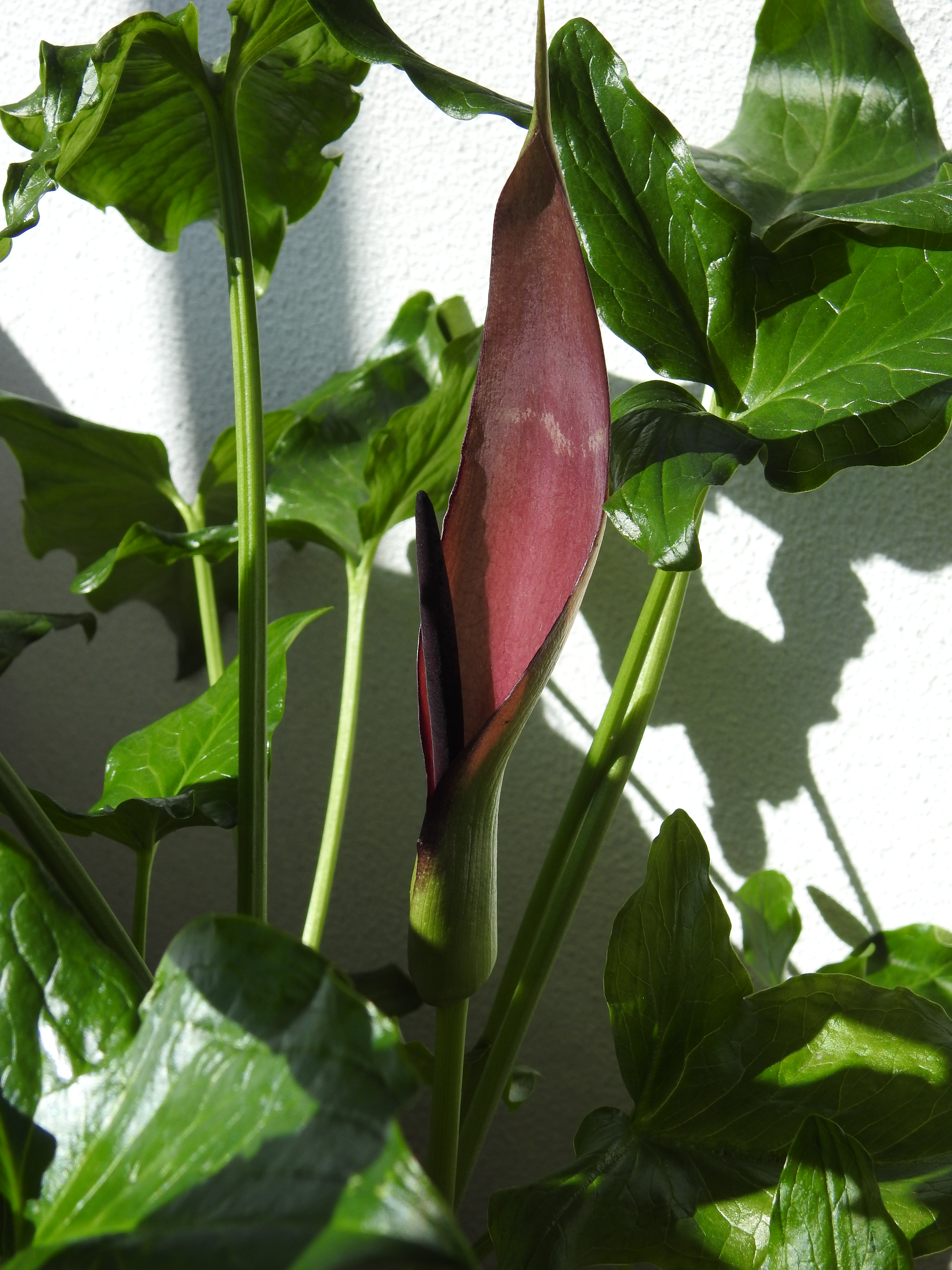
A. sintenisii

=== Fruit ===
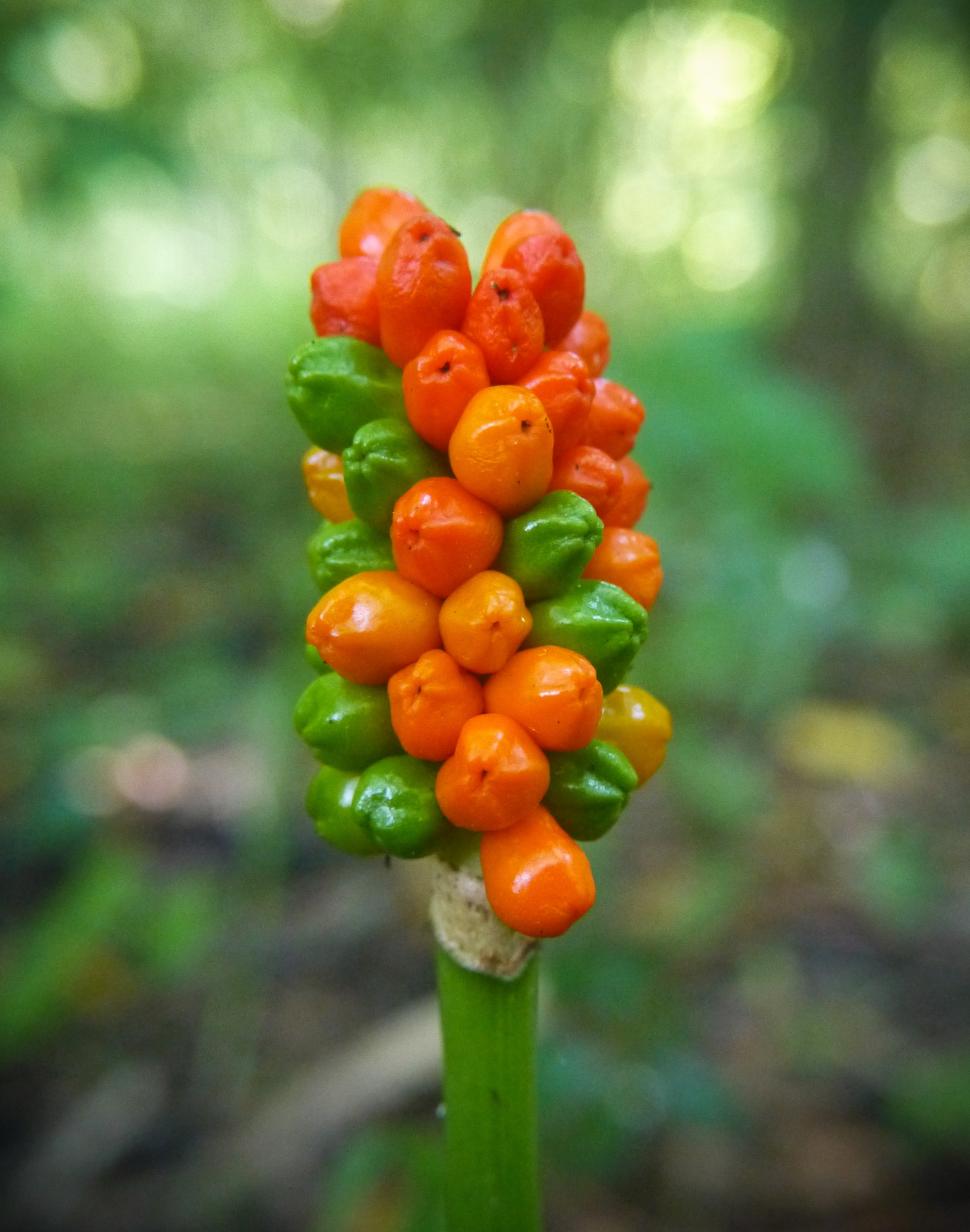
A. besserianum

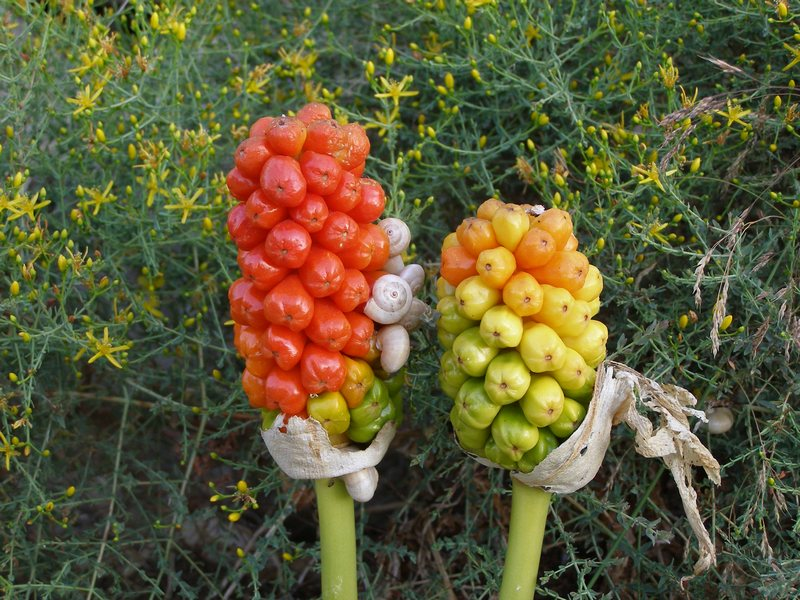
A. creticum

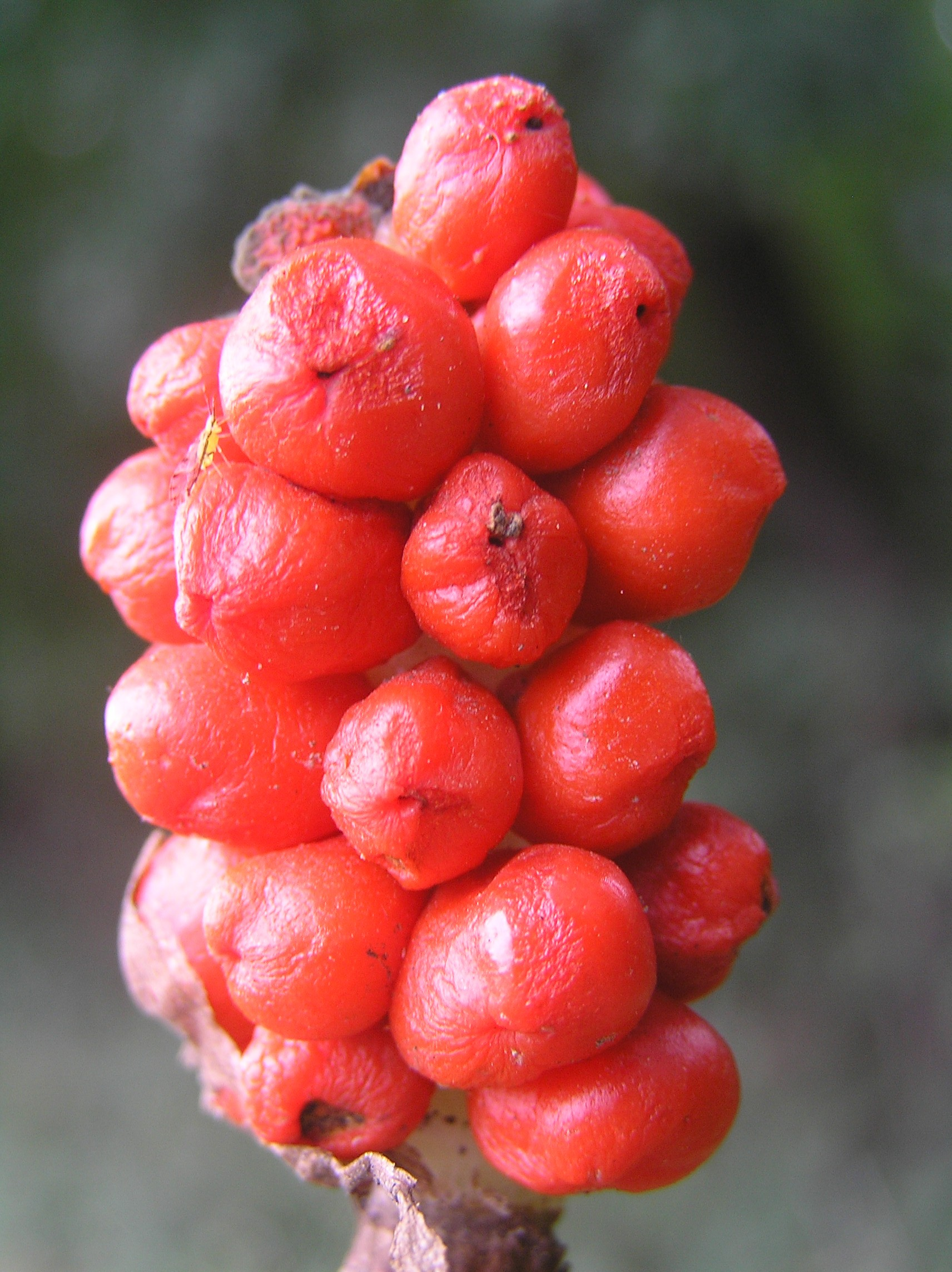
A. cylindraceum

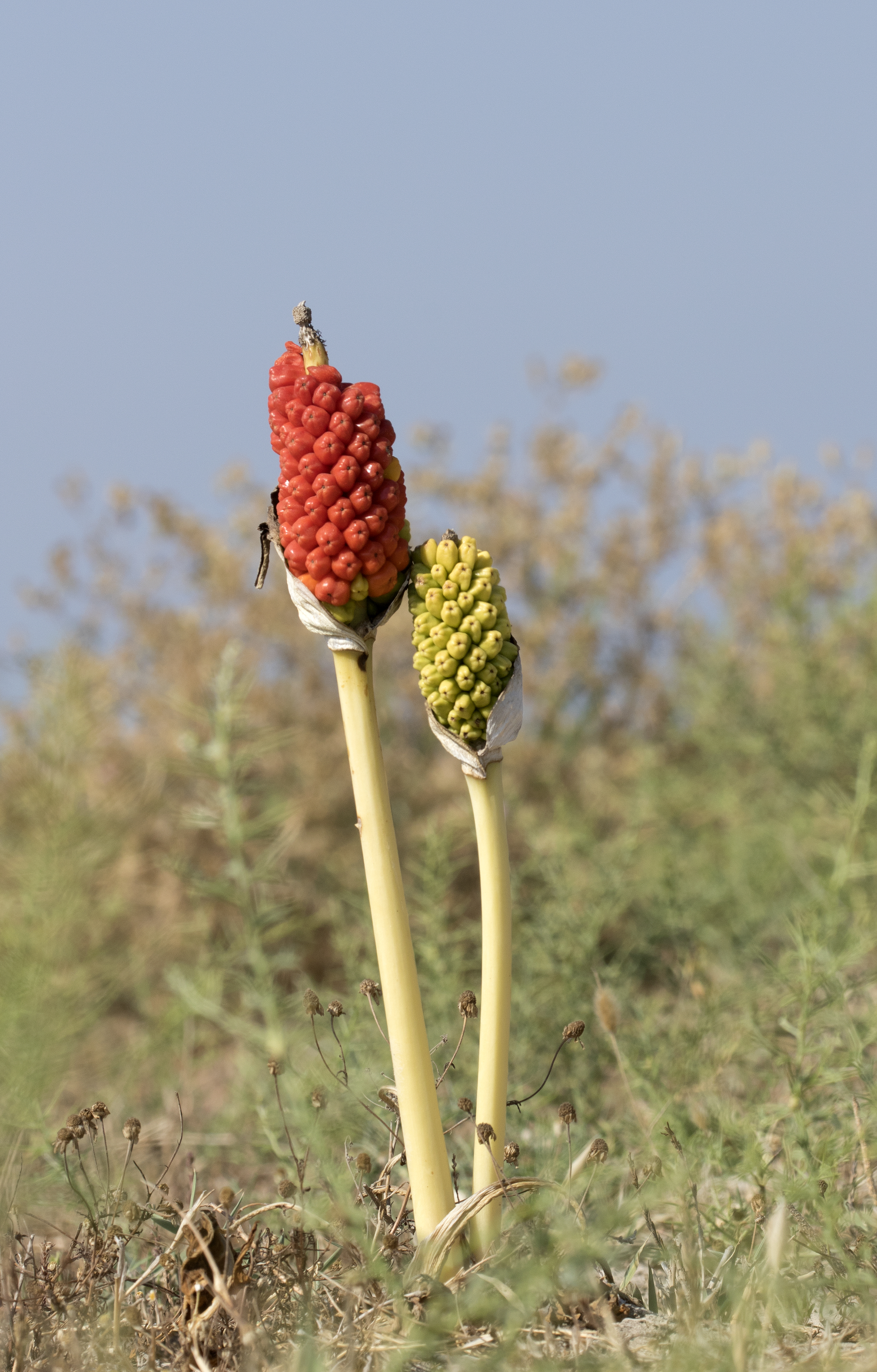
A. dioscoridis

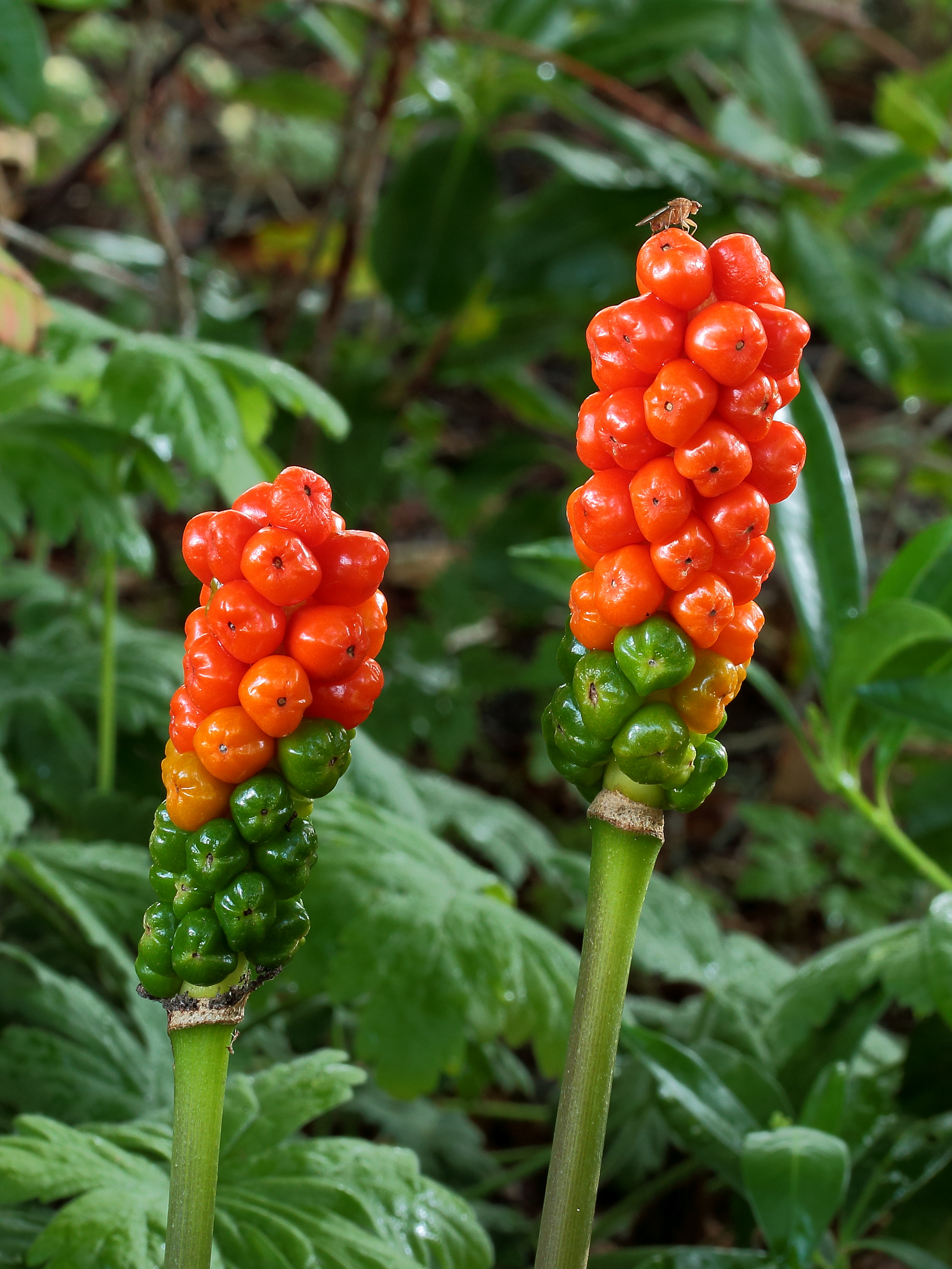
A. italicum

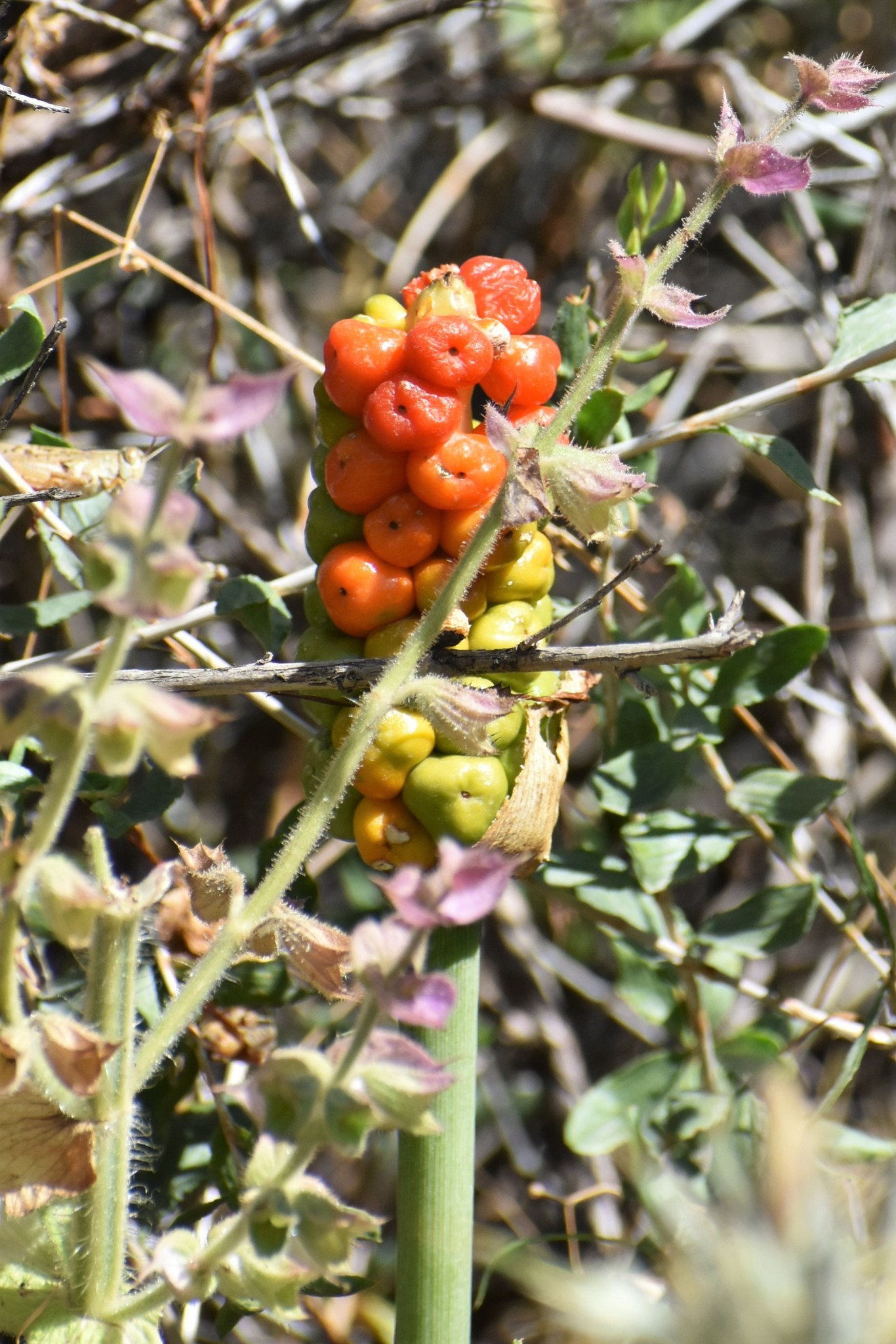
A. korolkowii

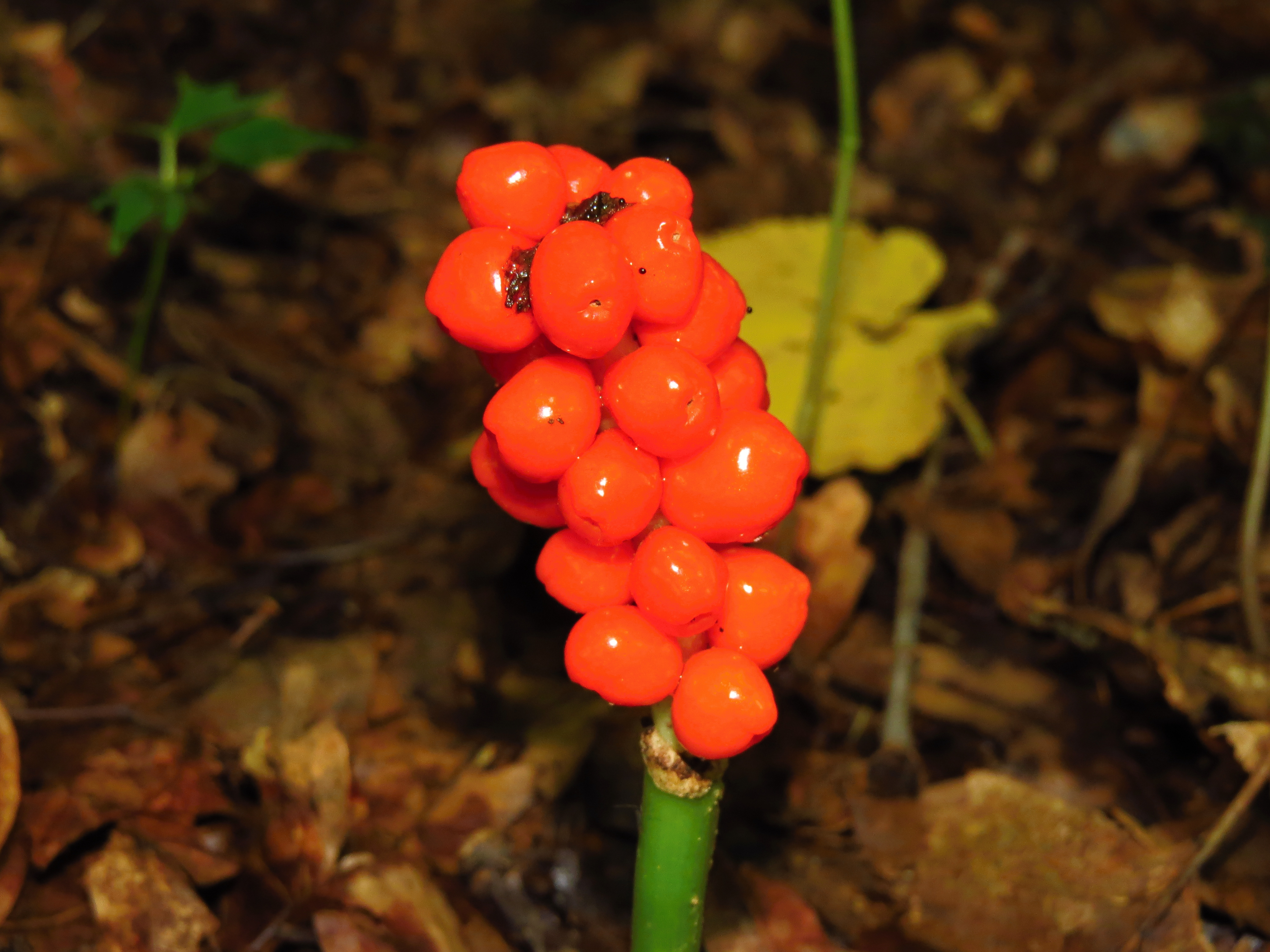
A. maculatum

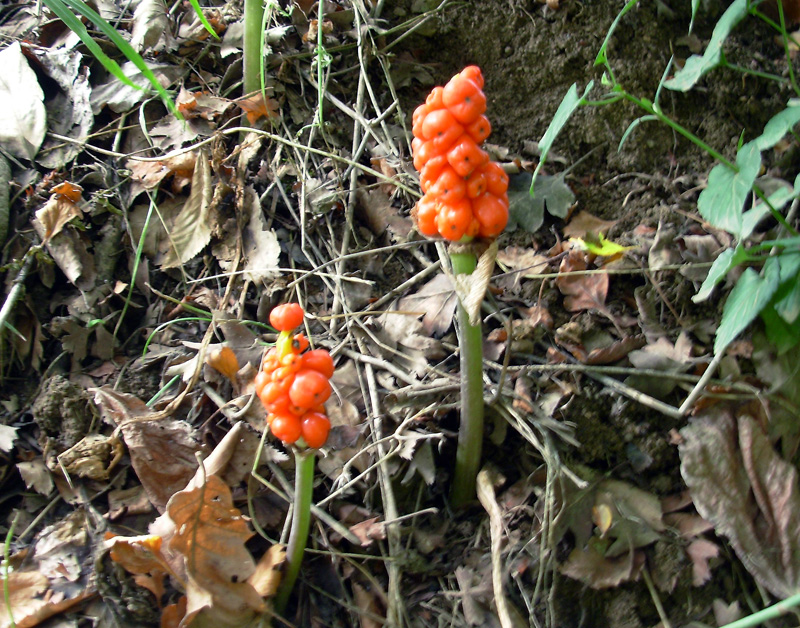
A. orientale

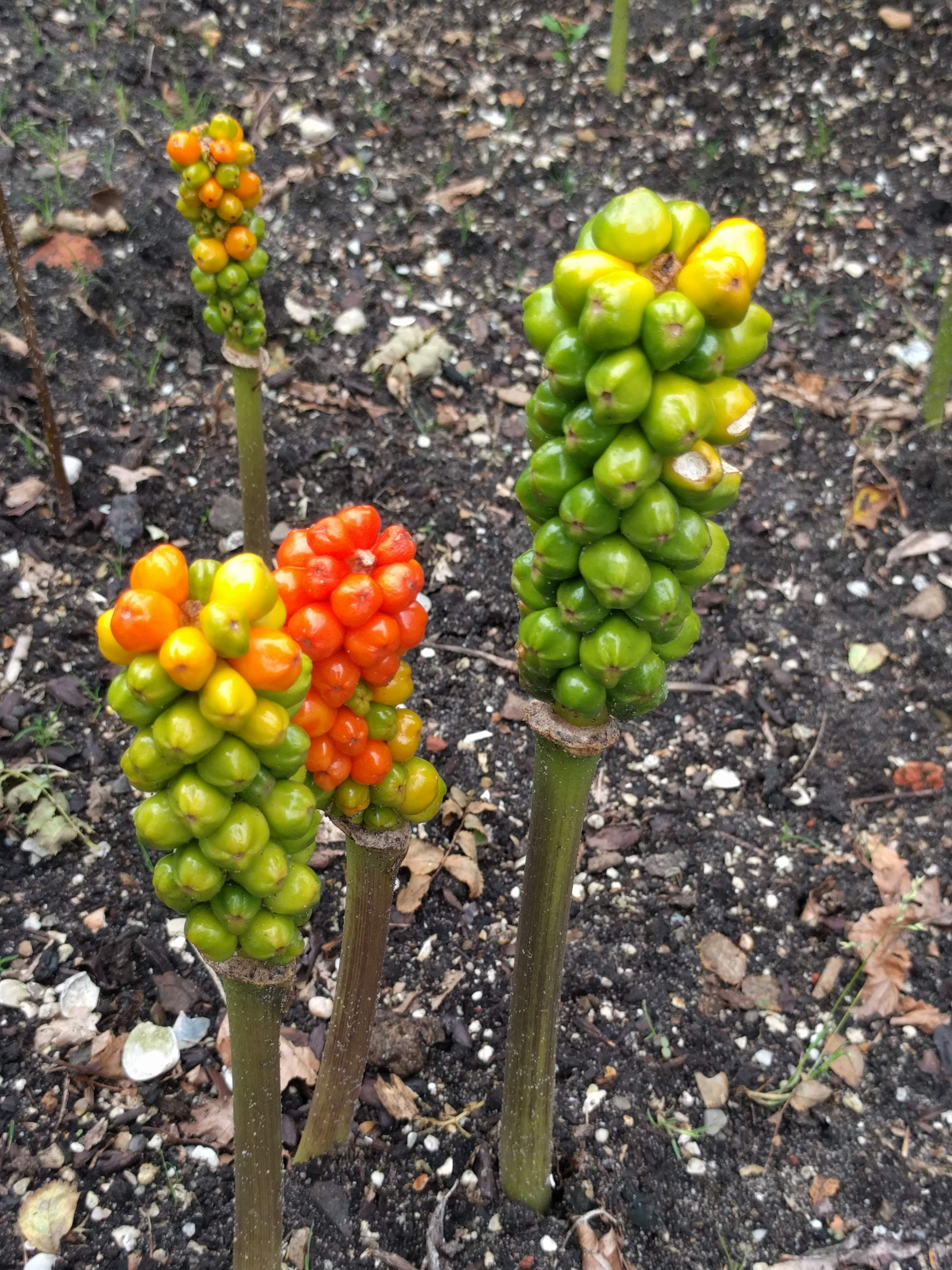
A. palaestinum

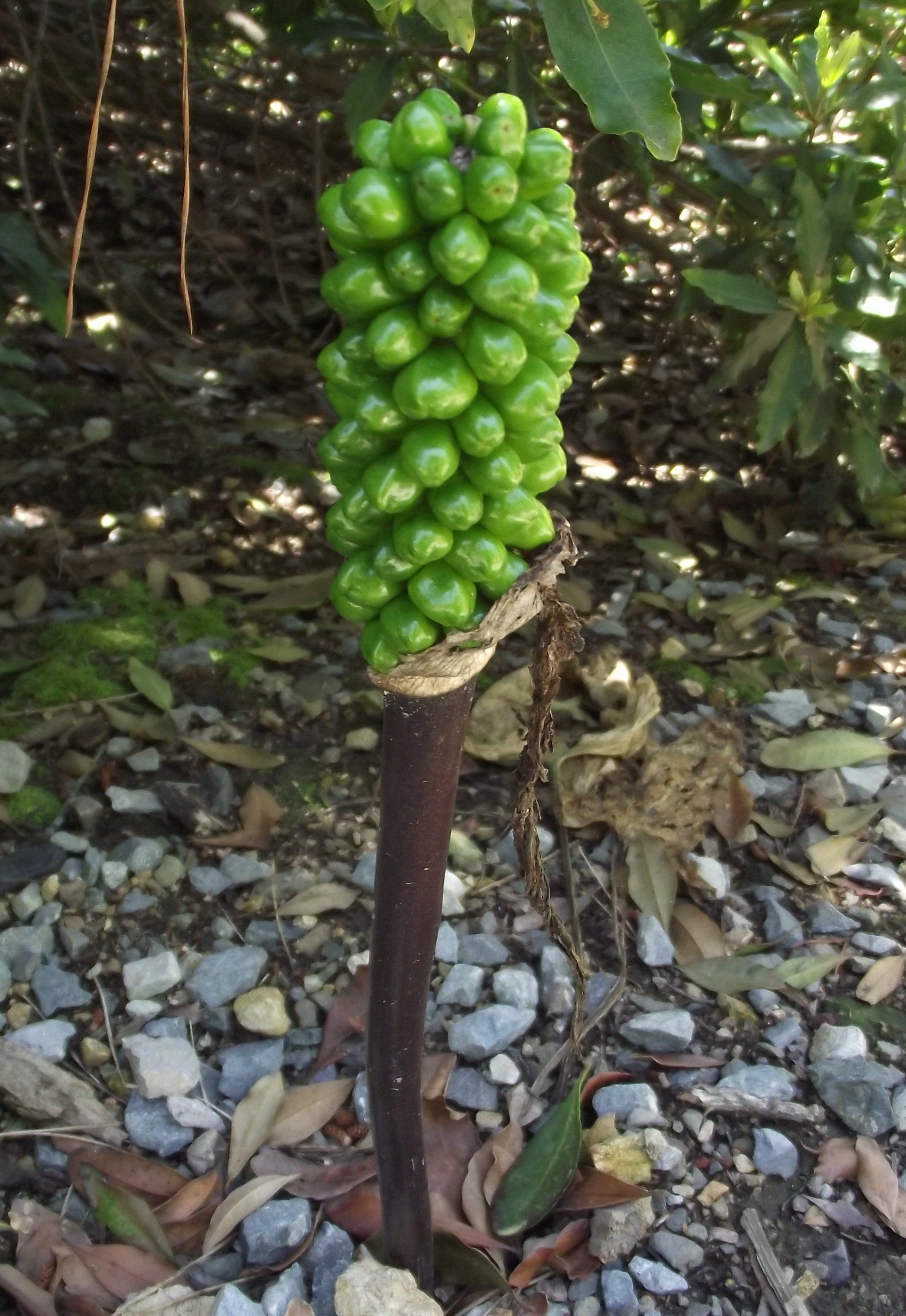
A. purpureospathum

=== Corm ===
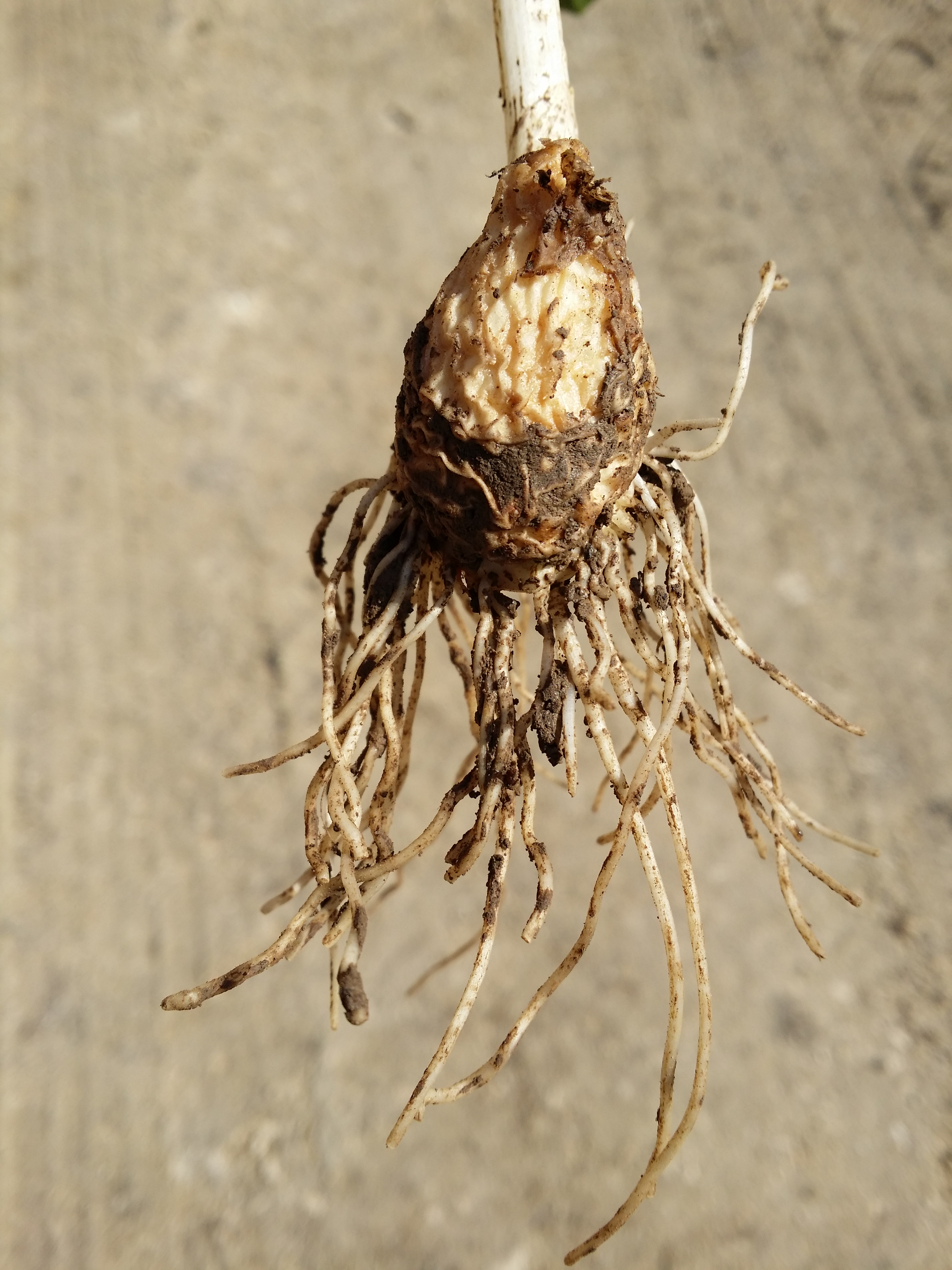
A. cylindraceum

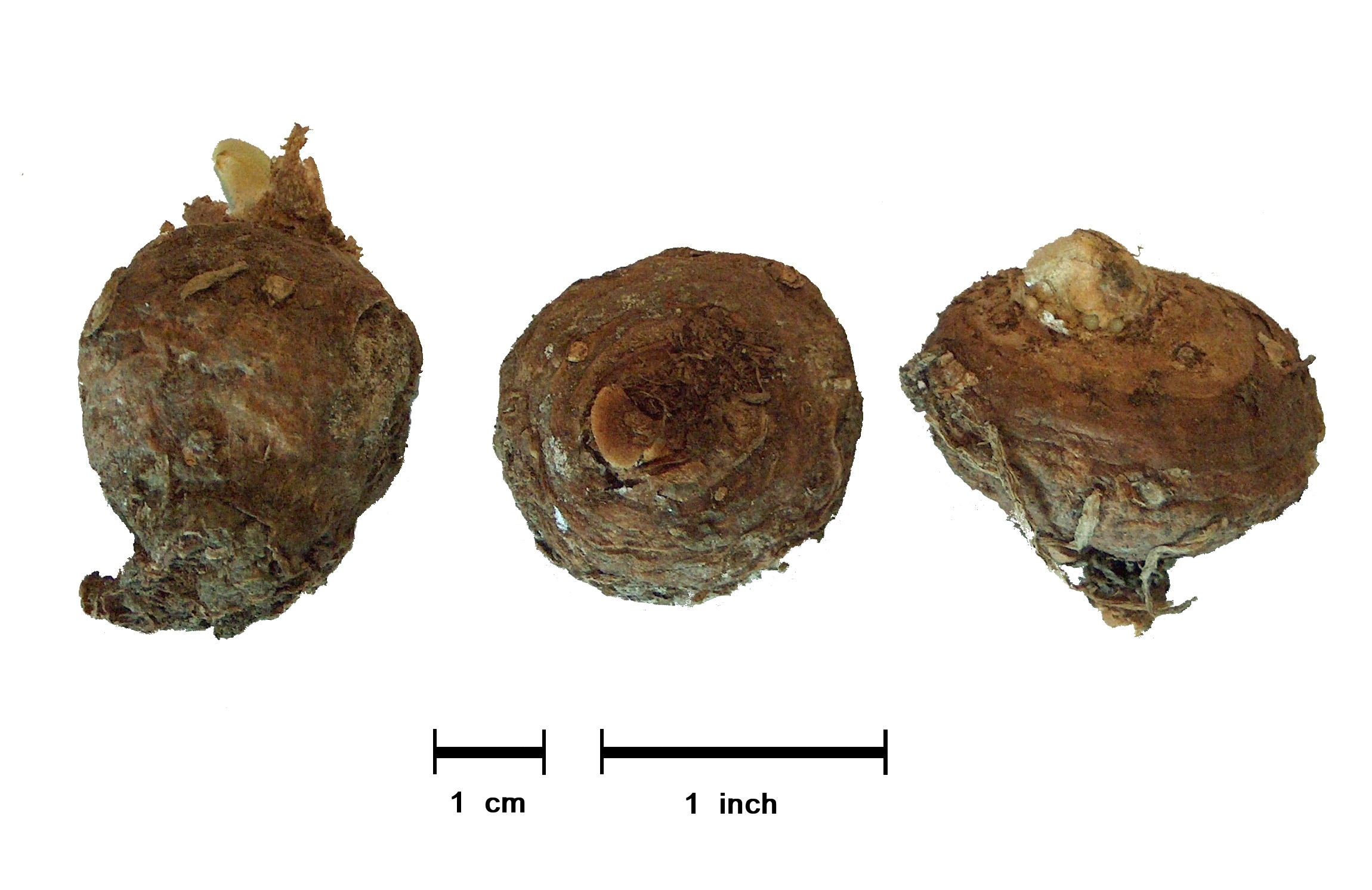
A. italicum

== See also ==
- List of plants known as lily

== Bibliography ==
- Łuczaj, Łukasz; Emre, Gizem (2025-02-13). "Lords-and-Ladies (Arum) as Food in Eurasia: A Review". Plants. 14 (4): 577. Bibcode:2025Plnts..14..577L. doi:10.3390/plants14040577. eISSN 2223-7747. PMC 11859539. PMID 40006836.
- Zi, Haoyu; Chen, Rui; Jia, Nan; Ma, Yuxuan; Zhao, Chunchang; Chen, Zhe; Zhang, Jingwei (2024-11-21). "Impact of Cooking Duration on Calcium Oxalate Needle-like Crystals in Plants: A Case Study of Vegetable Taro Flowers in Yunnan". Foods. 13 (23): 3730. doi:10.3390/foods13233730. ISSN 2304-8158. PMC 11640078. PMID 39682802.
- Kozuharova, Ekaterina; Pasdaran, Ardalan; Hamedi, Azadeh; Batovska, Daniela; Georgiev, Milen; Marchev, Andrey; Attard, Everaldo; Gibernau, Marc (2024-03-30). "Bioactive Compounds and Biological Activities of Arum L.". Bioactive Compounds in the Storage Organs of Plants. pp. 105–138. doi:10.1007/978-3-031-44746-4_6. ISBN 978-3-031-44746-4.
- Sousa Paiva, Élder Antônio (2021-05-27). "Do calcium oxalate crystals protect against herbivory?". Concepts & Synthesis. 108 (3) 24. Bibcode:2021SciNa.108...24P. doi:10.1007/s00114-021-01735-z. eISSN 1947-9468. PMID 34043088.
- Linz, Jeanine; Stökl, Johannes; Urru, Isabella; Krügel, Tamara; Stensmyr, Marcus C.; Hansson, Bill S. (2010-04-01). "Molecular phylogeny of the genus Arum (Araceae) inferred from multi–locus sequence data and AFLPs". Taxon. 59 (2): 405–415. Bibcode:2010Taxon..59..405L. doi:10.1002/tax.592006. eISSN 1996-8175.
- Lobin, Wolfram; Neumann, Michael; Bogner, Josef; Boyce, Peter C. (2007-12-21). "A new Arum species (Areae, Araceae) from NE Turkey and Georgia". Willdenowia. 37 (2): 445–449. Bibcode:2007Willd..37..445L. doi:10.3372/wi.37.37206. ISSN 0511-9618. JSTOR 20371373.
- Boyce, Peter C. (2006). "Arum—a Decade of Change" (PDF). Aroideana. 29: 132–137. ISSN 0197-4033.
- Gibernau, Marc; Macquart, David; Przetak, Gilles (2004). "Pollination in the genus Arum – a review" (PDF). Aroideana. 27: 148–166. ISSN 0197-4033.
- Boyce, Peter C. (1993-05-14). The Genus Arum. Kew Royal Botanic Gardens. ISBN 0112500854.
- Boyce, Peter C. (1989). "A New Classification of Arum with Keys to the Infrageneric Taxa". Kew Bulletin. 44 (3): 383–395. Bibcode:1989KewBu..44..383B. doi:10.2307/4110359. ISSN 0075-5974. JSTOR 4110359.
