= Dehing Patkai Landscape =

Dehing Patkai Rainforest

Dehing Patkai Landscape, located in the Upper Assam, stretches for over roughly 600 square kilometres and comprises three large blocks of forests (Jeypore, Upper Dehing West Block and Upper Dehing East Block) and several forest fragments. The forest is classified as a lowland Tropical Wet Evergreen Forest (Dipterocarpus-Mesua). It falls under Indo-Burma Biodiversity Hotspot. Due to its biodiversity and significance for elephant habitat, parts of the landscape are recognised as Dehing Patkai Elephant Reserve and 111 km^{2} is protected as the Dehing Patkai Wildlife Sanctuary since 2004.

The name Dehing Patkai comes from the Dehing river and Patkai hills. It is popularly referred to as "The Amazon of East".

== Climate ==
Dehing Patkai landscape has tropical monsoon rainforest climate with heavy monsoon downpour. The temperature reaches a Peak in June and falls with the arrival of monsoons. July is the month of heaviest rainfall and monsoons end in September. The dry period ranges from October to February. The average temperature ranges from 6 °C to 38 °C. There are 119 to 164 rainy days per year.

== Flora ==
The Dehing Patkai Landscape is one of the richest spots for biodiversity in India. It has hundreds of plant species which range from Shorea assamica and Dipterocarpus retusus, occupying the top canopy of the forest at heights of 50 m, to Mesua ferrea and Vatica lanceifolia, which dominate the middle canopy, and a number of woody shrubs such as Saprosma ternatum, Livistona jenkinsiana and Calamus erectus, which constitute the undergrowth.

Dipterocarpus retusus, or hollong, the state tree of Assam dominates the forest while the forest floor is home to charismatic ground orchids. Some of the important tree species found in the forest area are: hollong, mekai (Shorea assamica), dhuna (Shorea robusta), nahar (Mesua ferrea, gurjan (Dipterocarpus turbinatus), outenga (Dillenia indica), different species of Ficus etc.

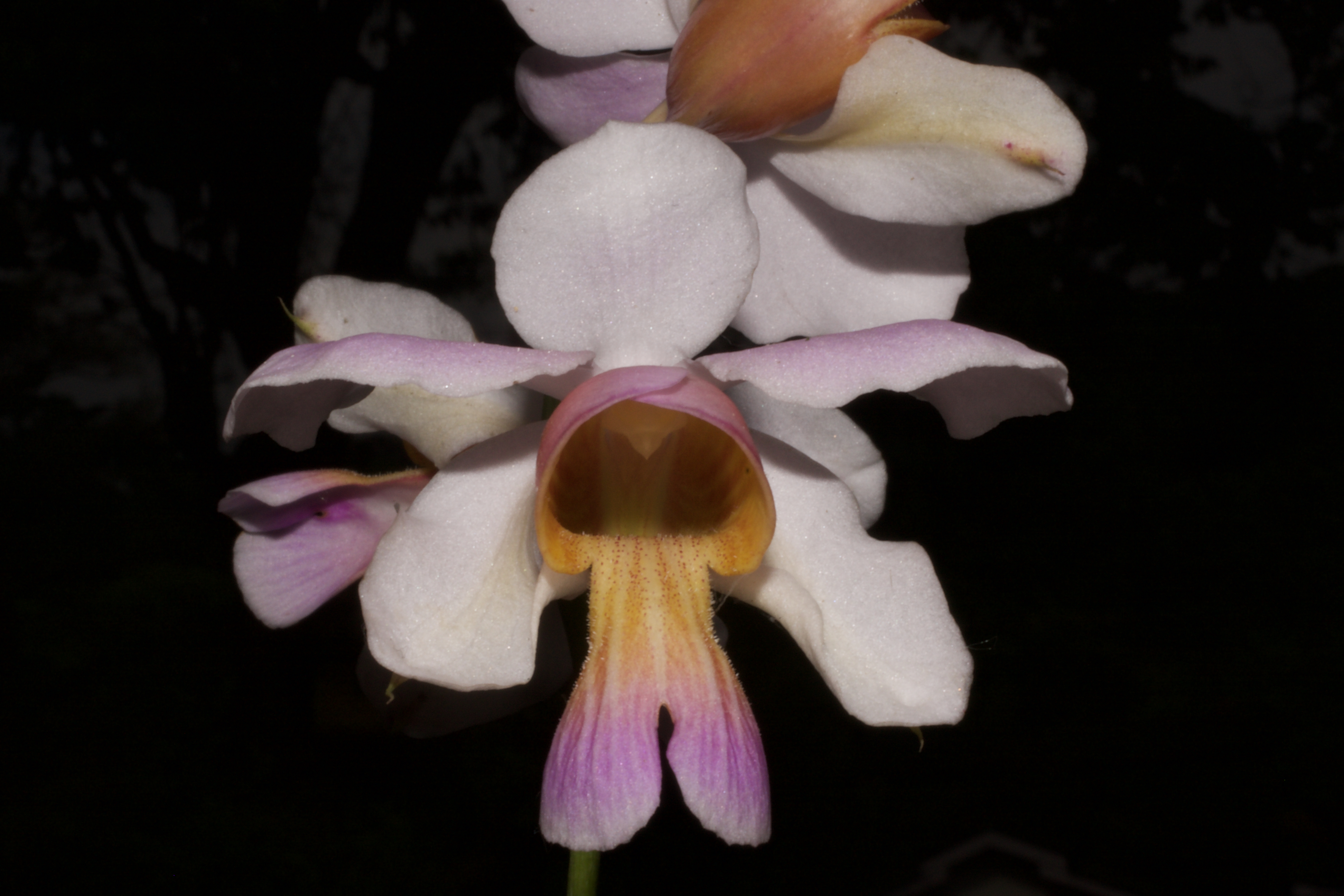
Papilionanthe teres orchid

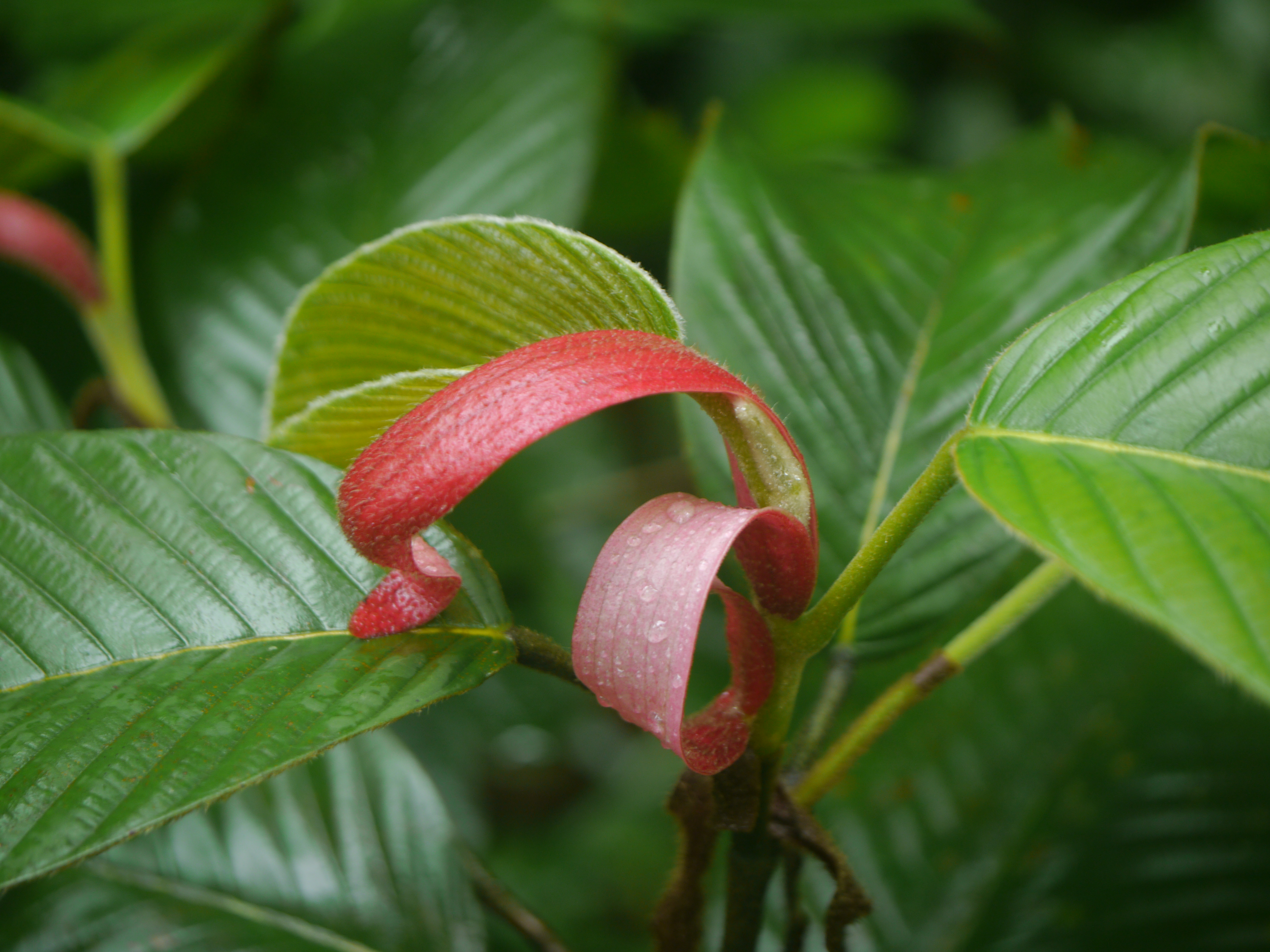
Dipterocarpus macrocarpus young leaf

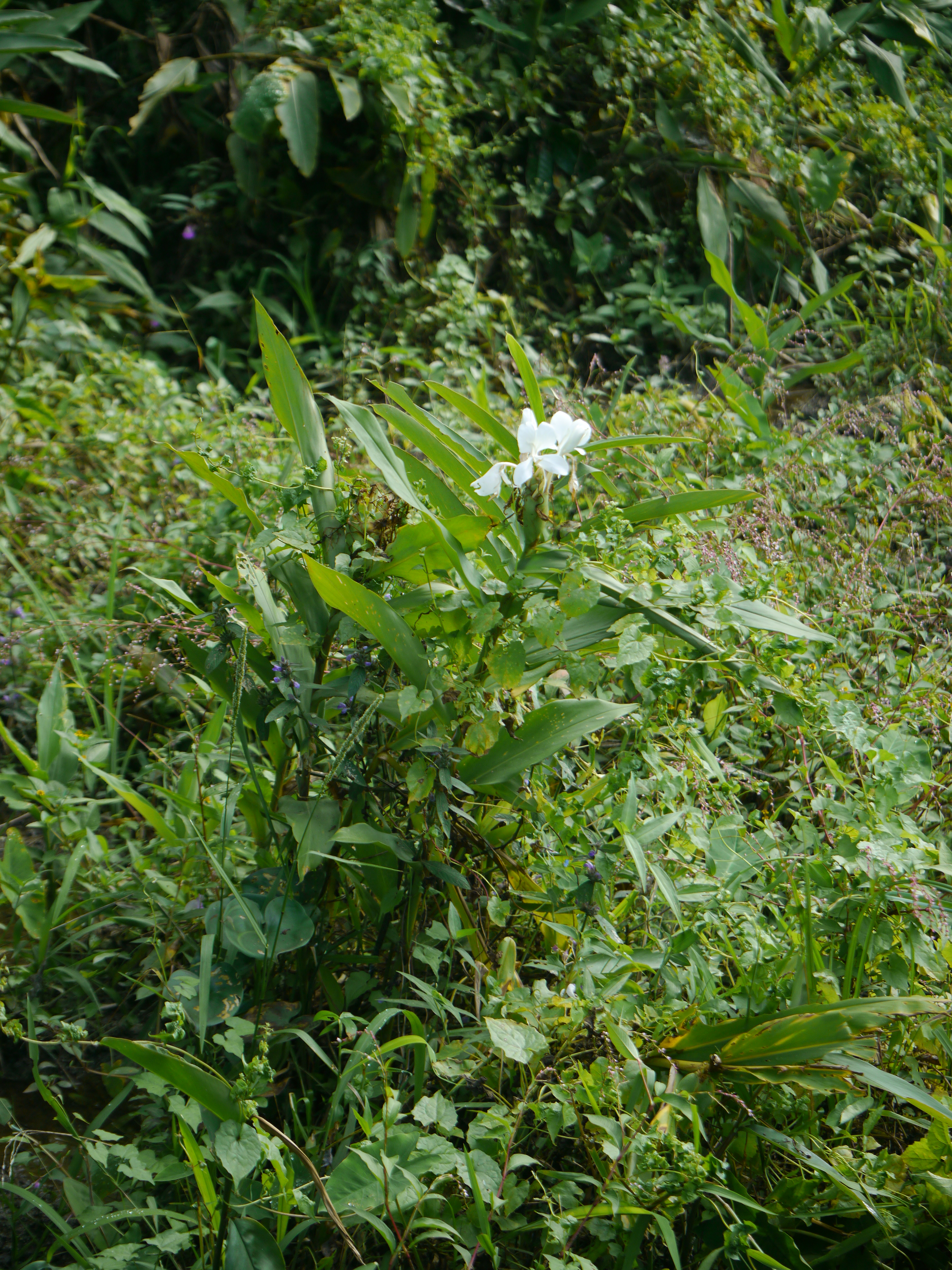
Hedychium coronarium

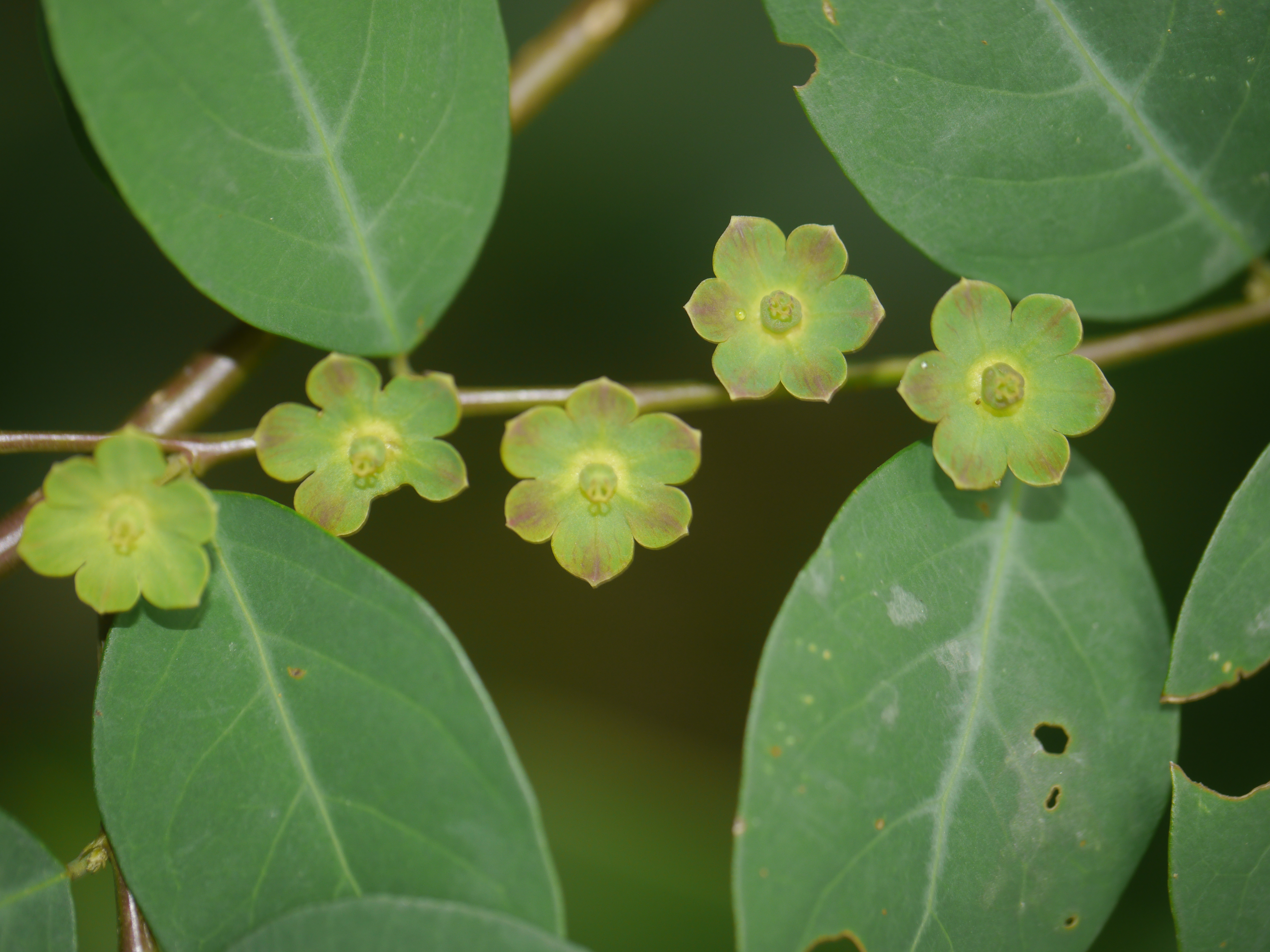
Breynea

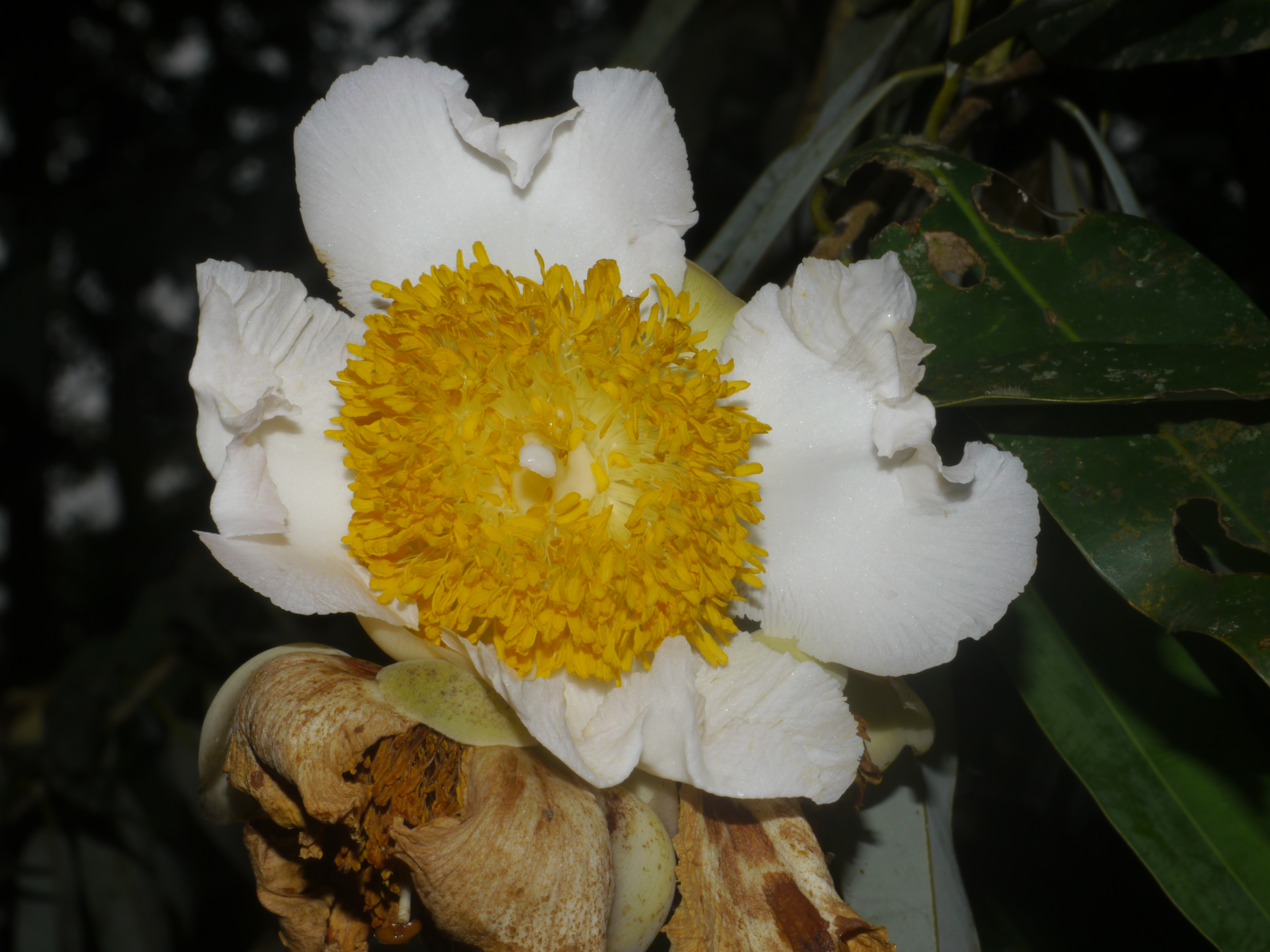
Mesua ferrea

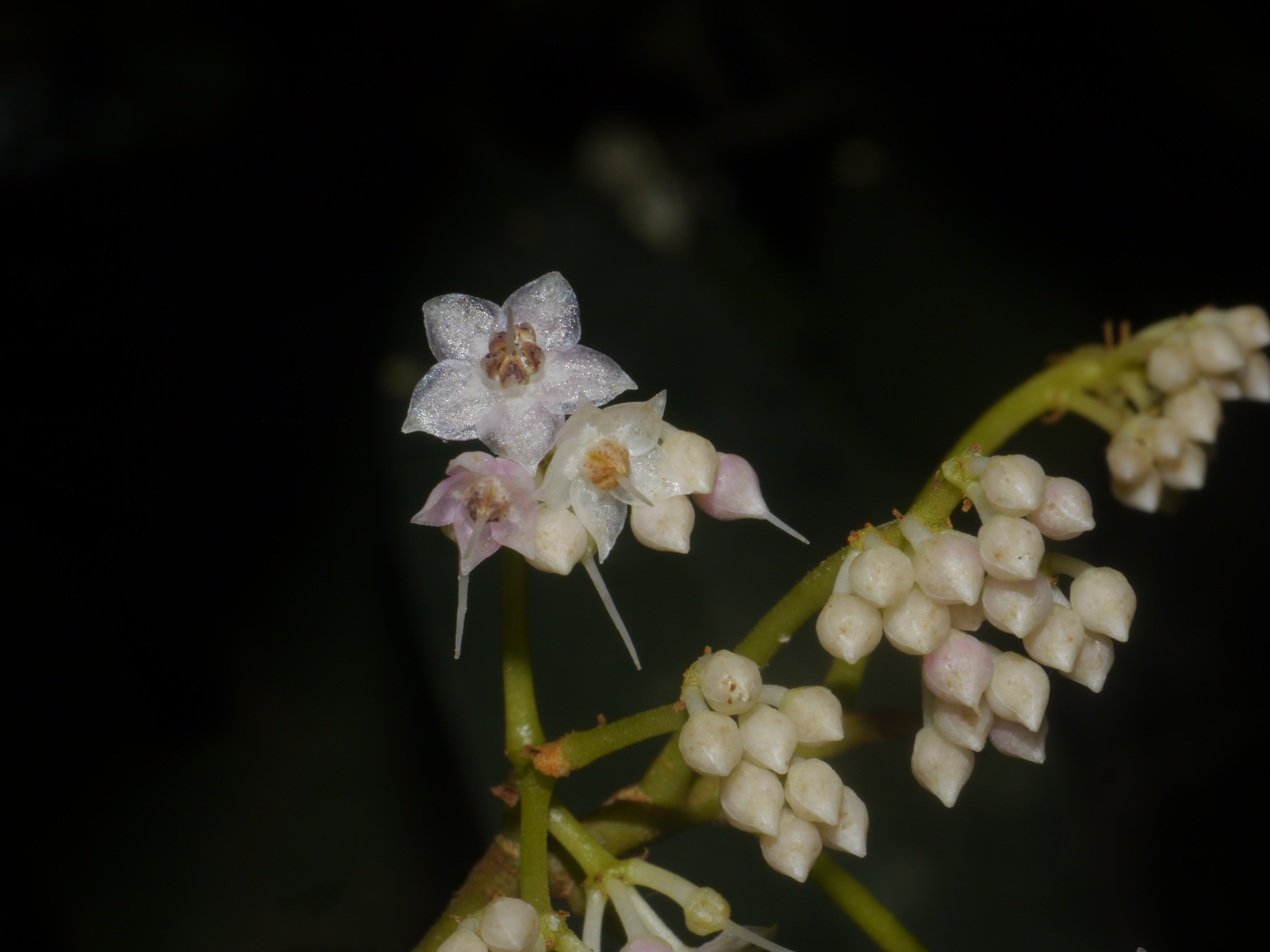
Ardisia

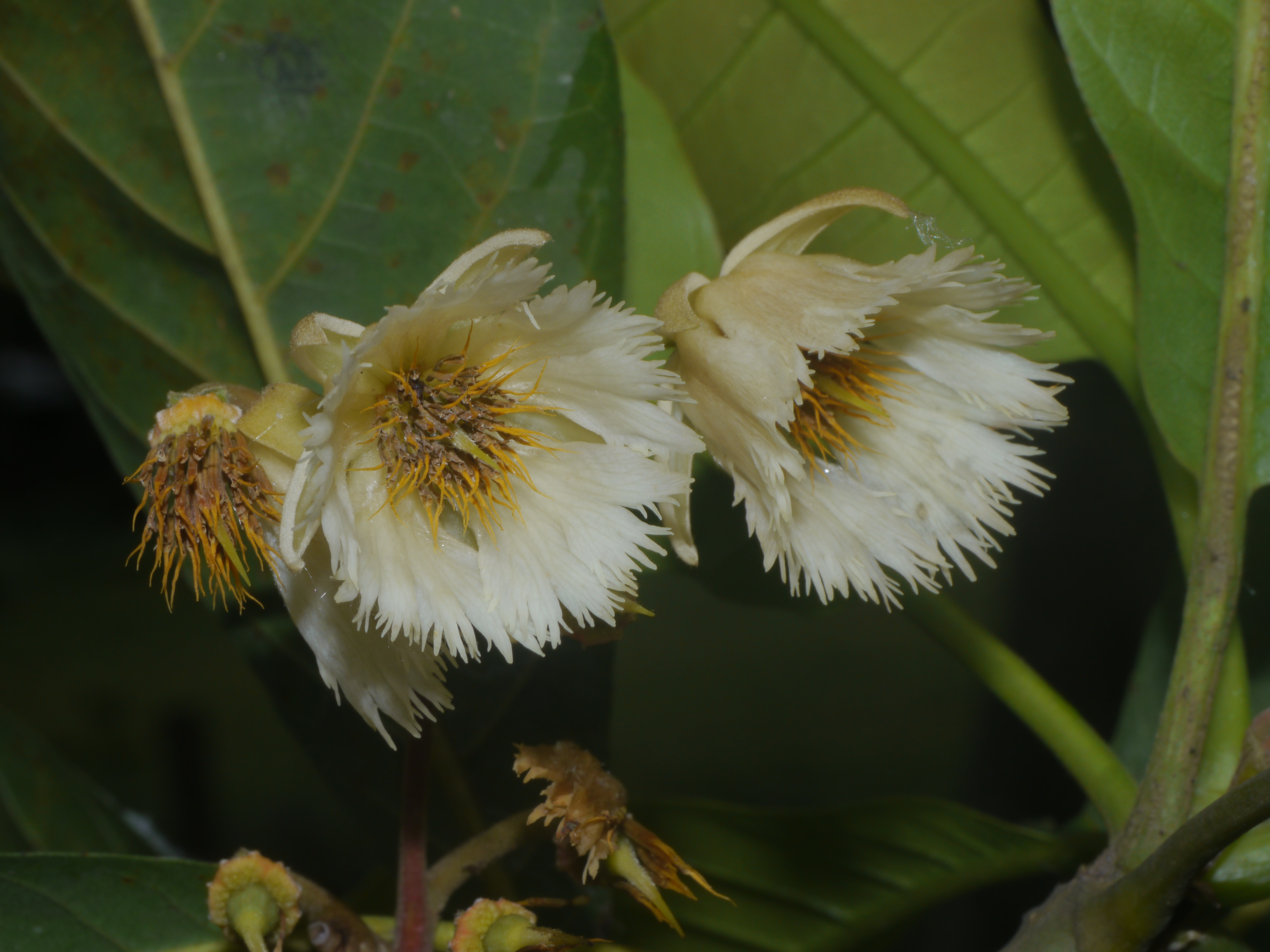
Elaeocarpus flower

Dehing Patkai is also an important biodiversity spot for its range of orchid species. There are around 100 species of orchid in this region, including Bulbophyllum ebulbum, Chrysoglossum erraticum, Chrysoglossum robinsonii, Eria connate, Eria pudica, Zeuxine clandestina, Hetaeria affinis, Thelasis pygmaea and Taeniophyllum crepidiforme.

== Fauna ==
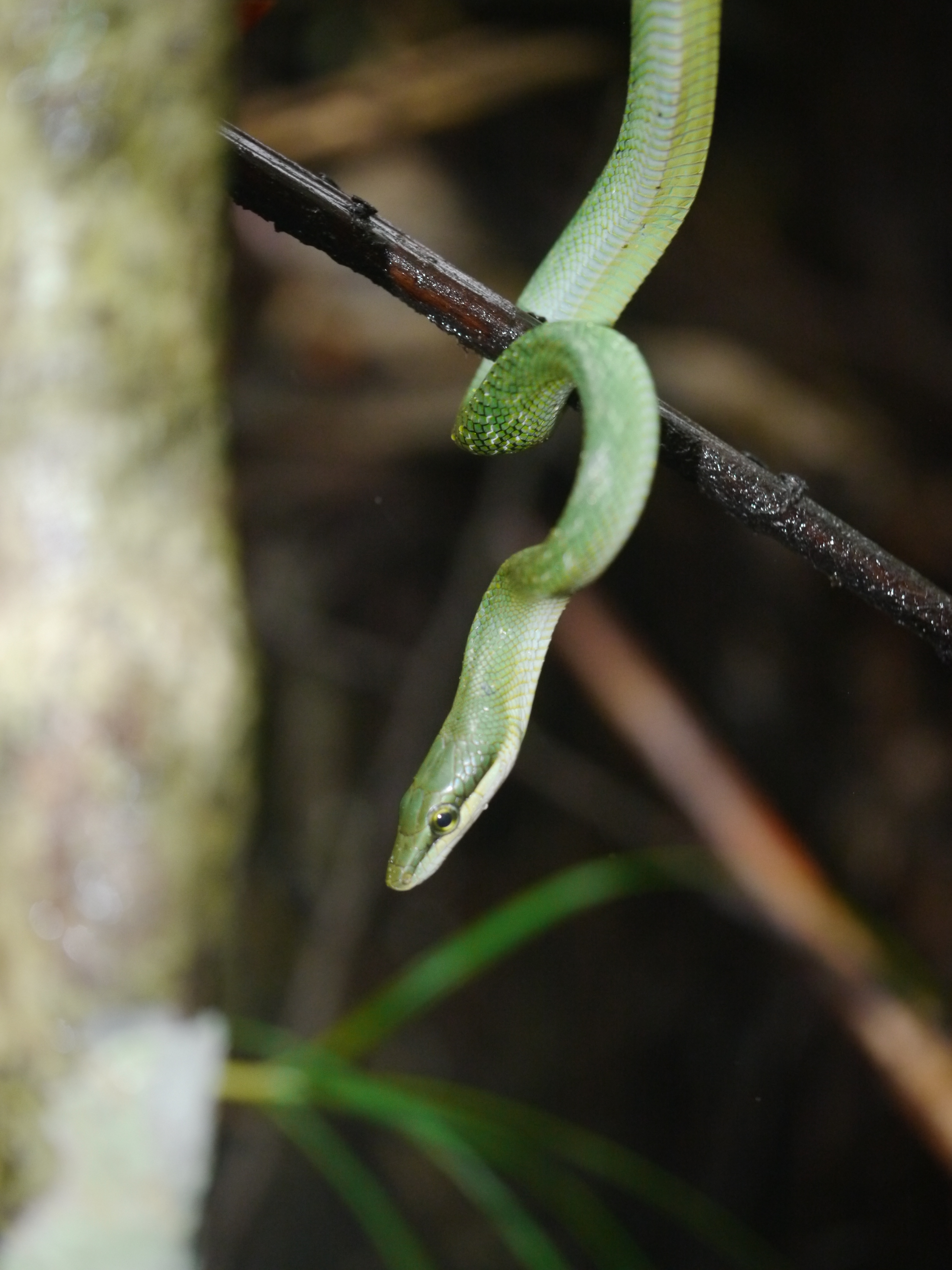
Green Trinket Snake

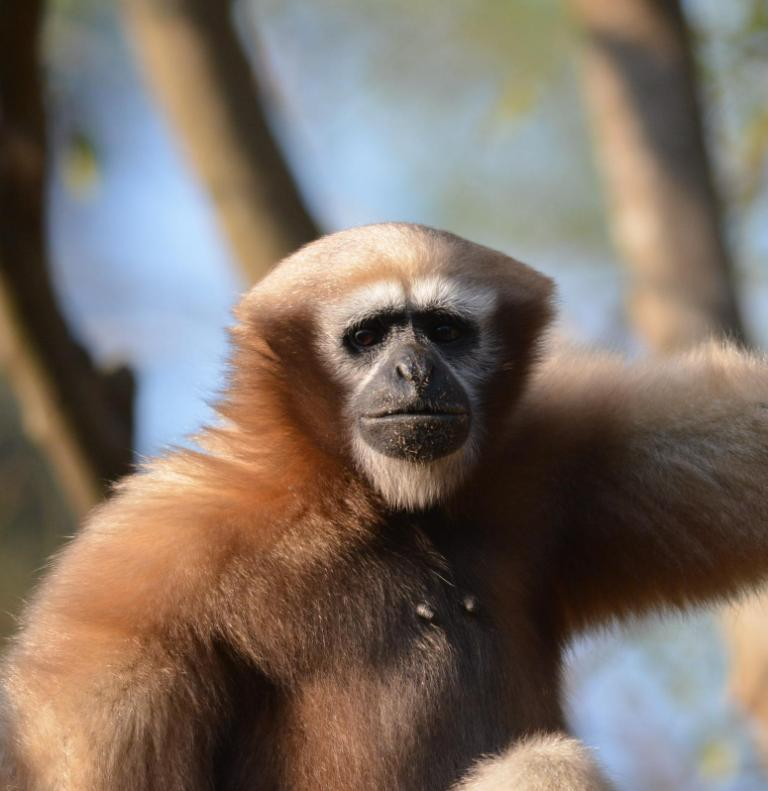
Hoolock Gibbon

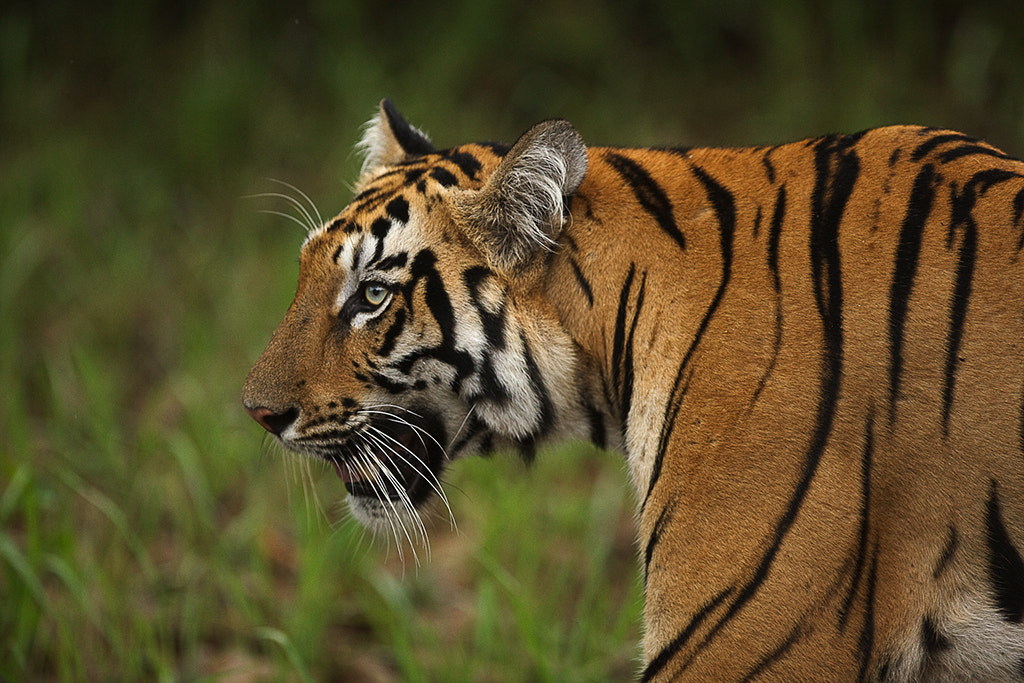
Royal Bengal Tiger

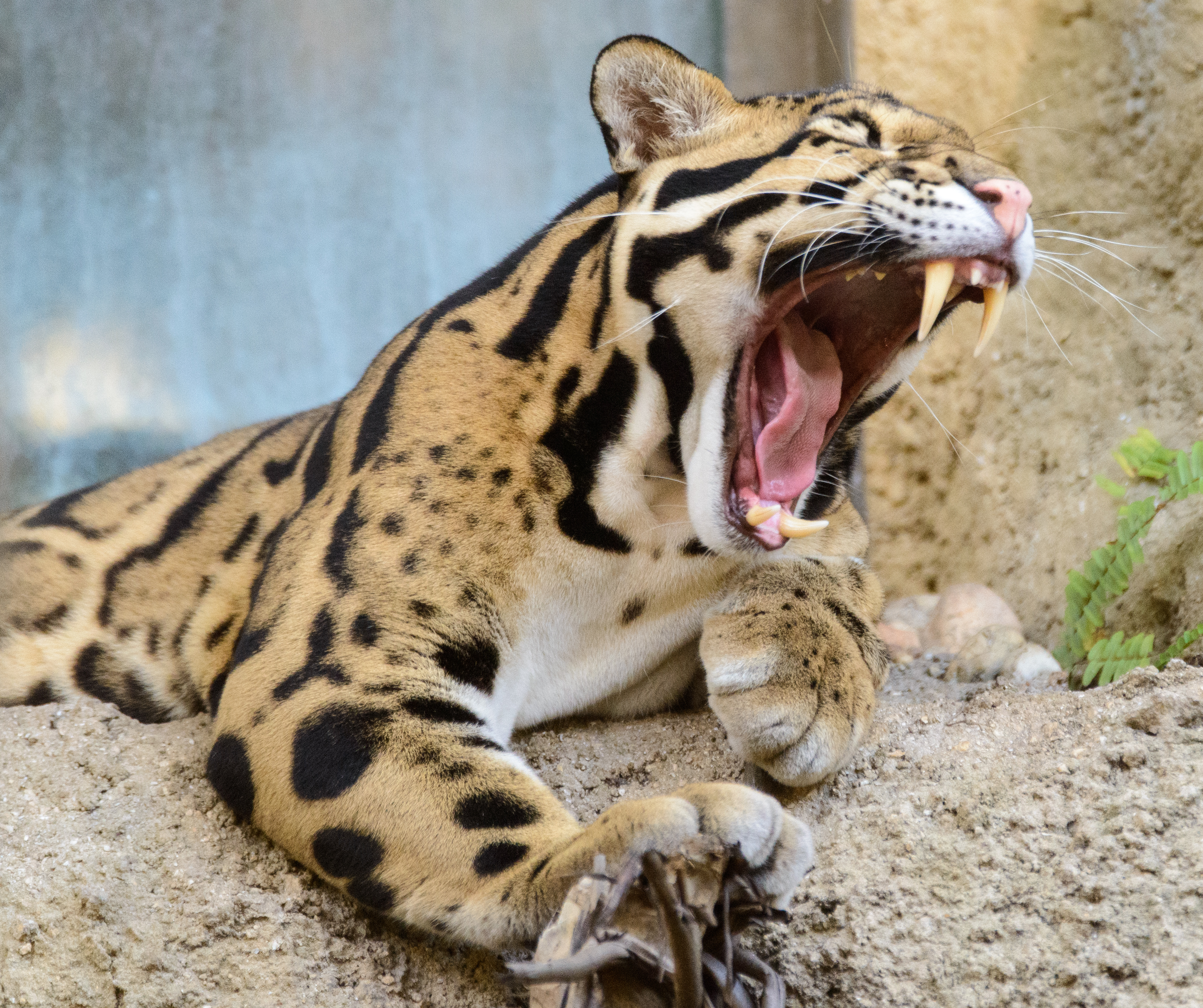
Clouded Leopard

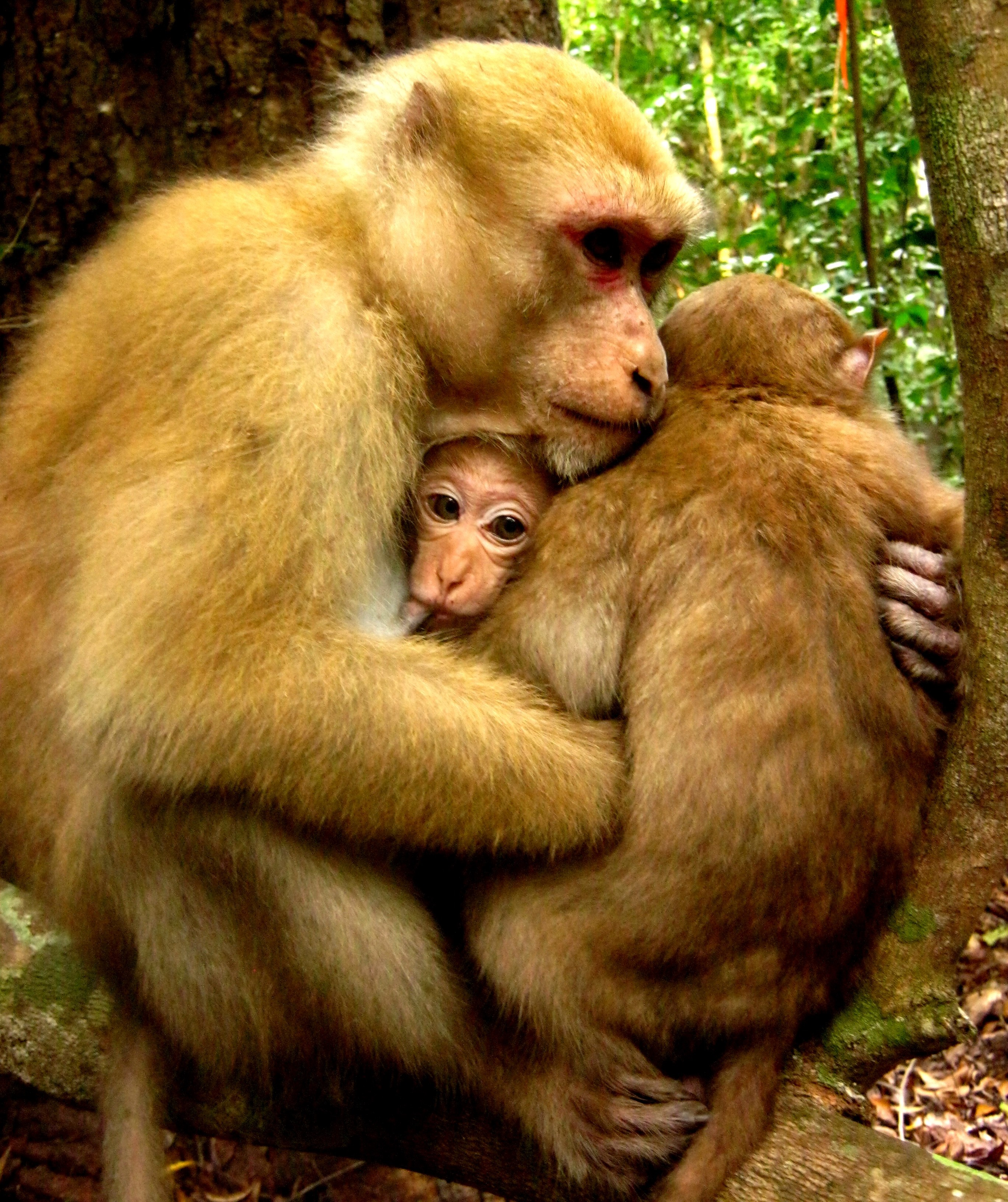
Assamese Macaque

Dehing Patkai landscape is a critical refuge for biodiversity as it provides habitat for species of most conservation concern at the sub-national level in India and species that are identified under the IUCN Red List. There is a wide variety of wildlife found in the landscape with as many as 47 species of mammals, 50 species of snakes, 13 species of lizards, few rare and threatened turtle species, more than 350 species of butterflies etc. It was the first place in the world to have presence of seven different species of wild cats in the world -tiger, leopard, clouded leopard, leopard cat, golden cat, jungle cat and marbled cat.

There are also seven species of primates found in the forest - Western hoolock gibbon, rhesus macaque, Assamese macaque, pig-tailed macaque, stump-tailed macaque, slow loris, and capped langur. It is also home to mammals like Asian elephant, gaur, Chinese pangolin, Himalayan black bear, black giant squirrel, Porcupine, Crab-eating mongoose, sambar, sun bear, barking deer, wild water buffalo etc.

== Avifauna ==
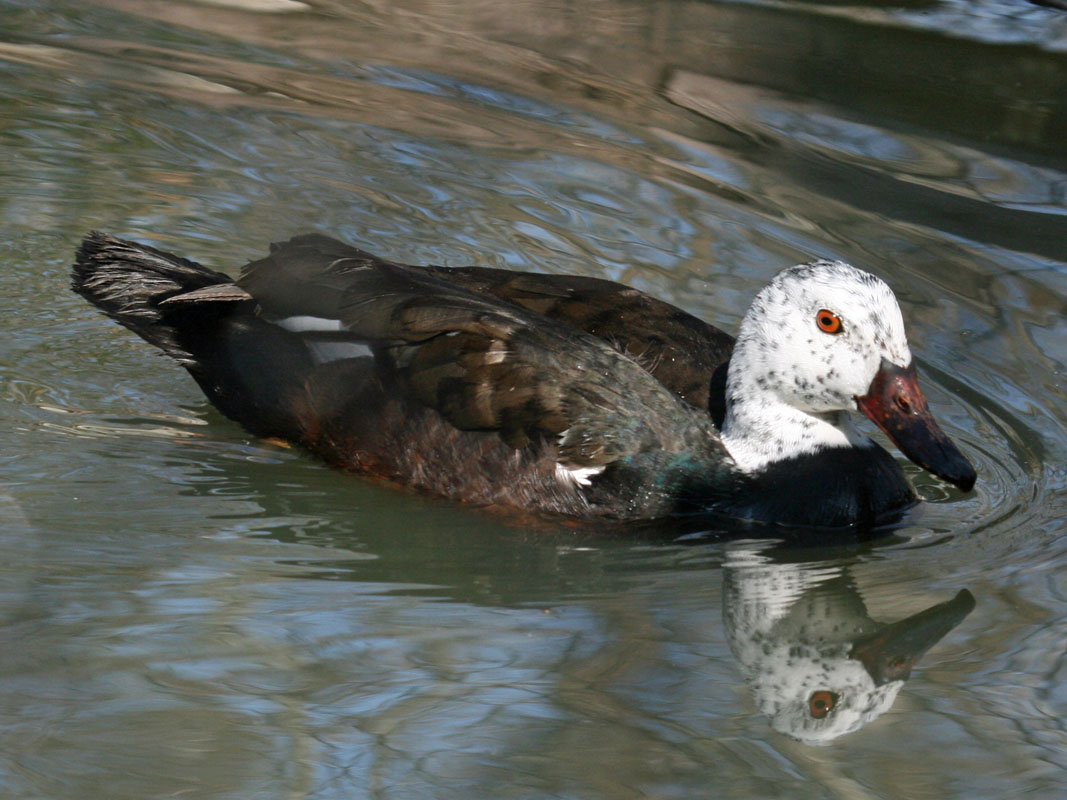
White-winged Duck

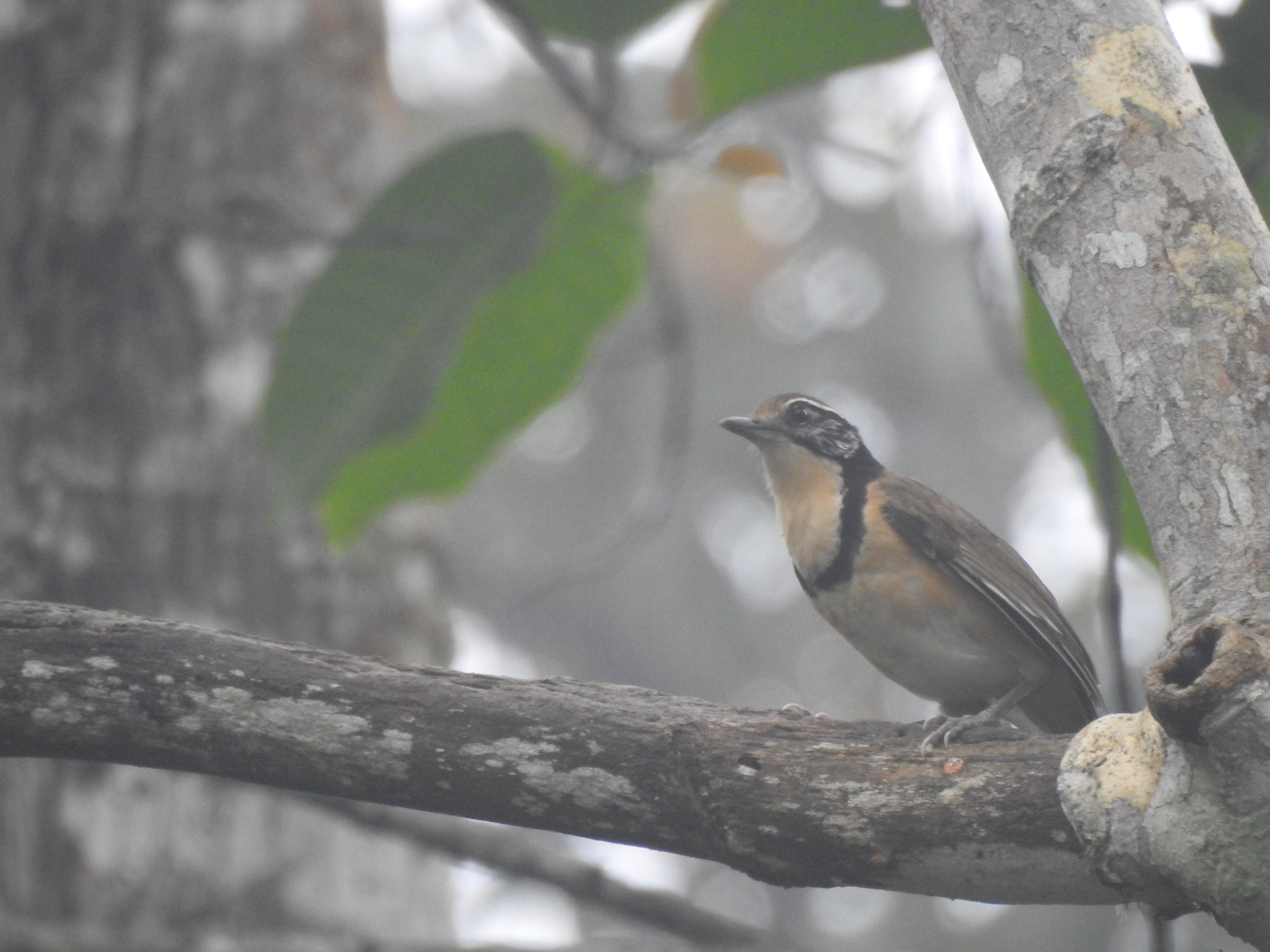
Greater Necklaced Laughing Thrush

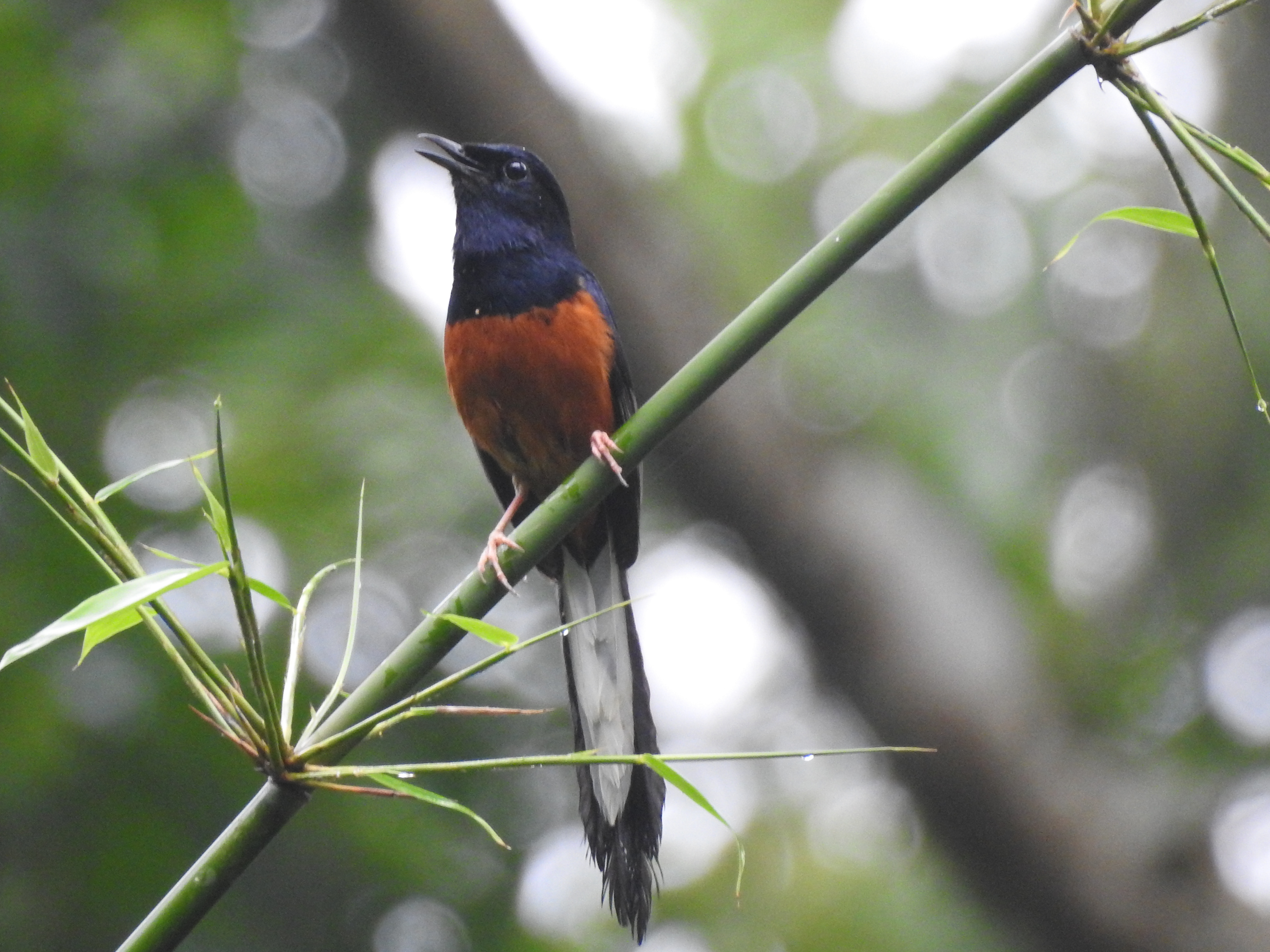
White Rumped Shama

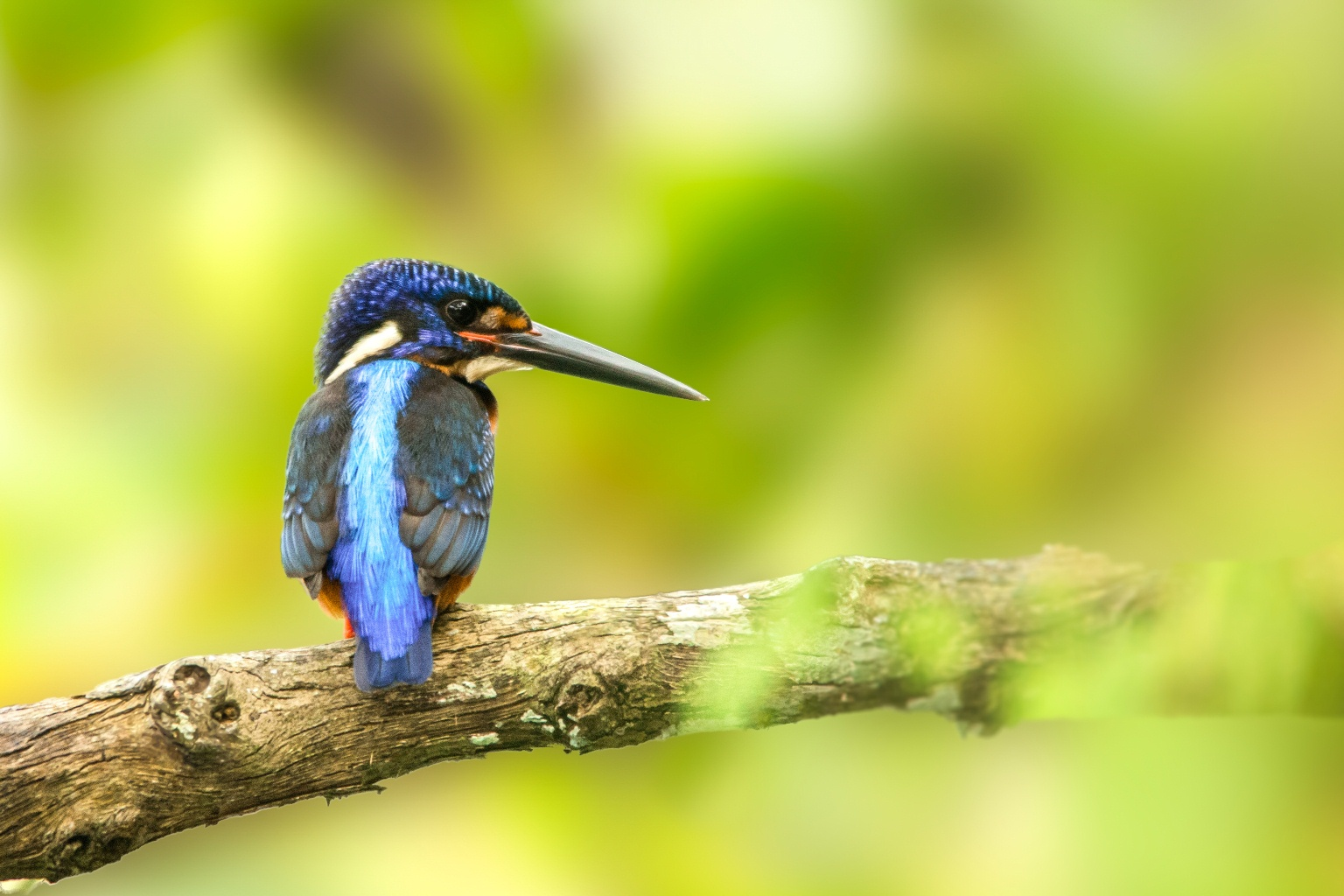
Blue-eared Kingfisher

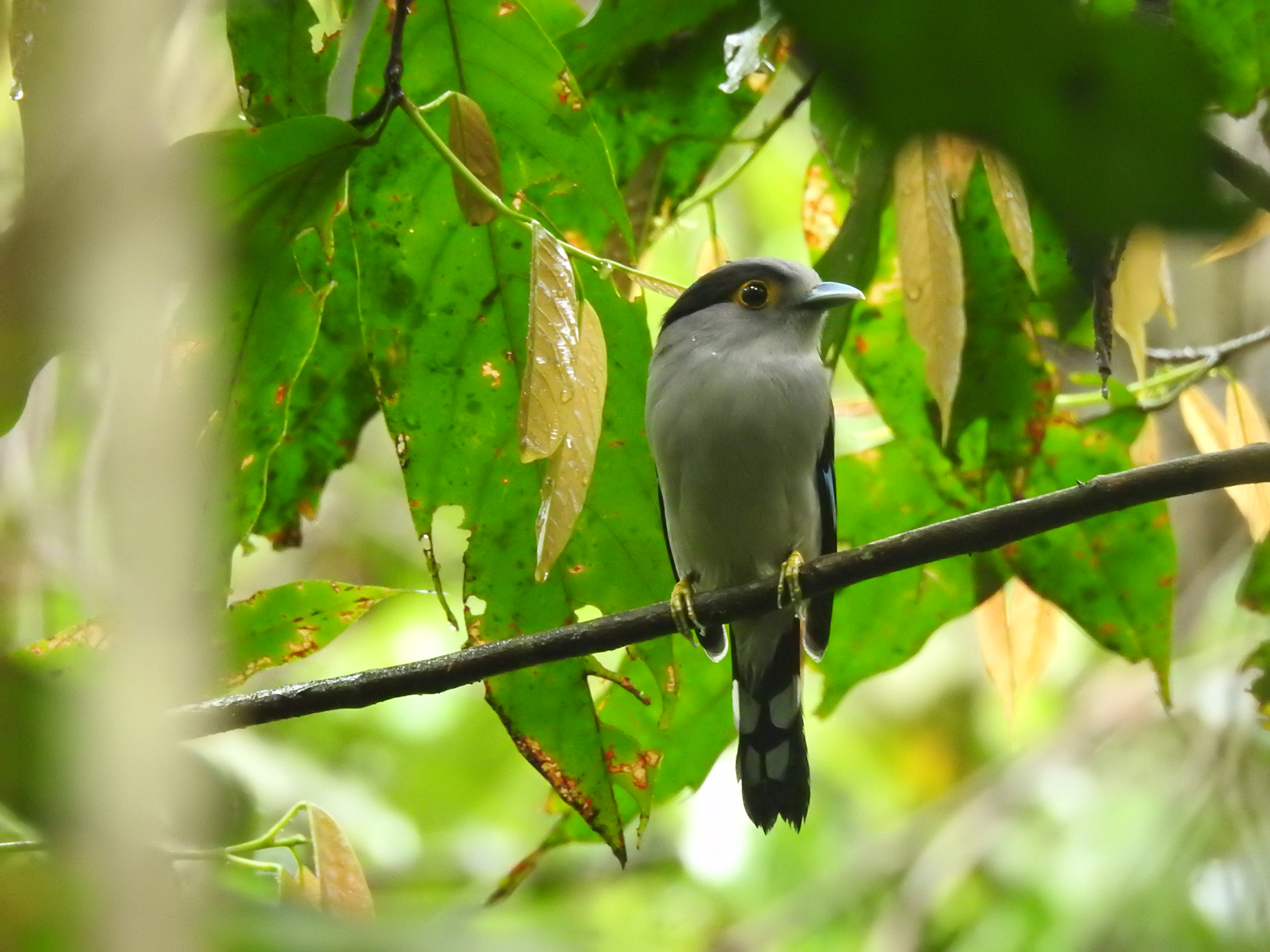
Silver Breasted Broadbill

The rich rainforest is well known for its avian diversity with nearly 400 species reported so far. A majority of these bird species are resident species. Some of the important bird species found in the area includes Slender-billed vulture, White-winged Duck (State bird of Assam), Greater Adjutant Stork, Lesser Adjutant Stork, Greater Spotted Eagle, Gray Peacock-Pheasant, Rufous-necked hornbill, Pale-capped Pigeon, brown hornbill, etc.

== Cultural groups ==
The Dehing Patkai Landscape lies within a mosaic of tea plantations, farmlands and oil and coalfields. There are also more than a dozen ethnic groups which have lived in this region. Some of the indigenous tribes from this region are Tai Phake, Khamyang, Khampti, Singpho, Nocte, Sonowal Kachari, Ahom and Moran.

== Coal mining ==
Dehing-Patkai landscape has been a site for legal and illegal coal mining. In April 2020, a coal mining project in the Dehing Patkai Elephant Reserve was approved by the National Board for Wildlife of India. Nearly a hundred hectares of land from reserve forest land was approved for a coal mining project by North-Easter Coal Field (NECF), a unit of Coal India Limited. This decision was challenged by environmental groups from Assam and other parts of the country, which highlighted the rich biodiversity harboured in the Dehing Patkai landscape. As a result of these awareness campaigns and protests, the North Eastern Coalfields (NEC), temporarily halted all of its operations in the region from June 3, 2020.

== See More ==
- Dehing Patkai National Park
