= Dehing Patkai National Park =

National park in Assam, India

- IUCN category II (national park)
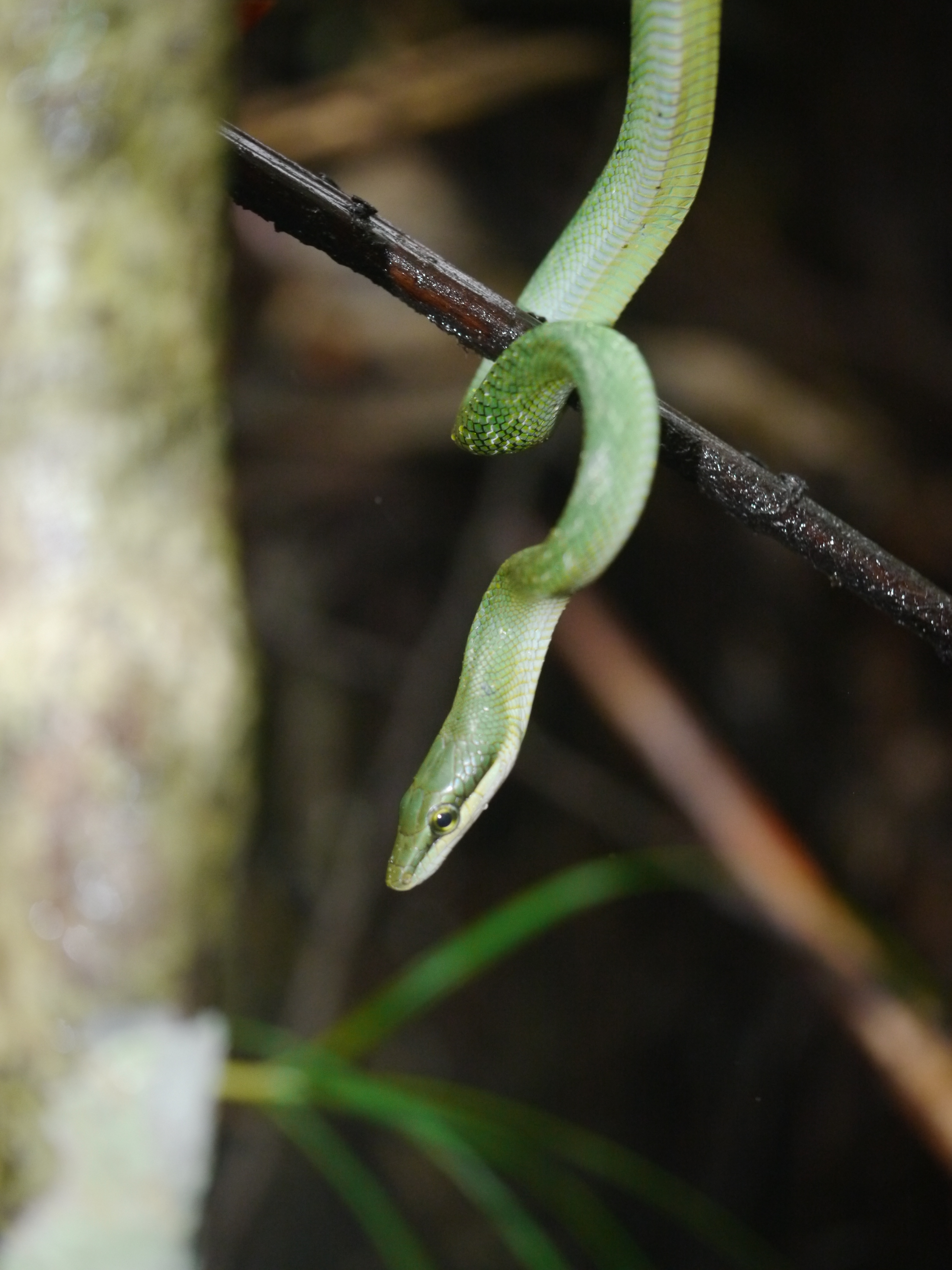
- Young Green Trinket Snake in Dehing Patkai National Park

- Location within Assam Location within India
- Interactive map of Dehing Patkai National Park
- Location: Dibrugarh and Tinsukia, Assam
- Nearest city: Khonsa, Naharkatia, Duliajan, Dibrugarh
- Coordinates: 27.331°N 95.526°E
- Area: 231.65 km^{2} (89.44 sq mi)
- Established: 2004; 22 years ago
- Governing body: Government of Assam

Dehing Patkai National Park is a national park in the Dibrugarh and Tinsukia districts of Assam covering an area of 231.65 km^{2} (89.44 sq mi) of rainforest. It is located in the Dehing Patkai Landscape, which is a dipterocarp-dominated lowland rainforest. The rainforest stretches for more than 575 km^{2} (222 sq mi) in the Dibrugarh, Tinsukia and Charaideo districts. The forest further spreads over in the Tirap and Changlang districts of Arunachal Pradesh.

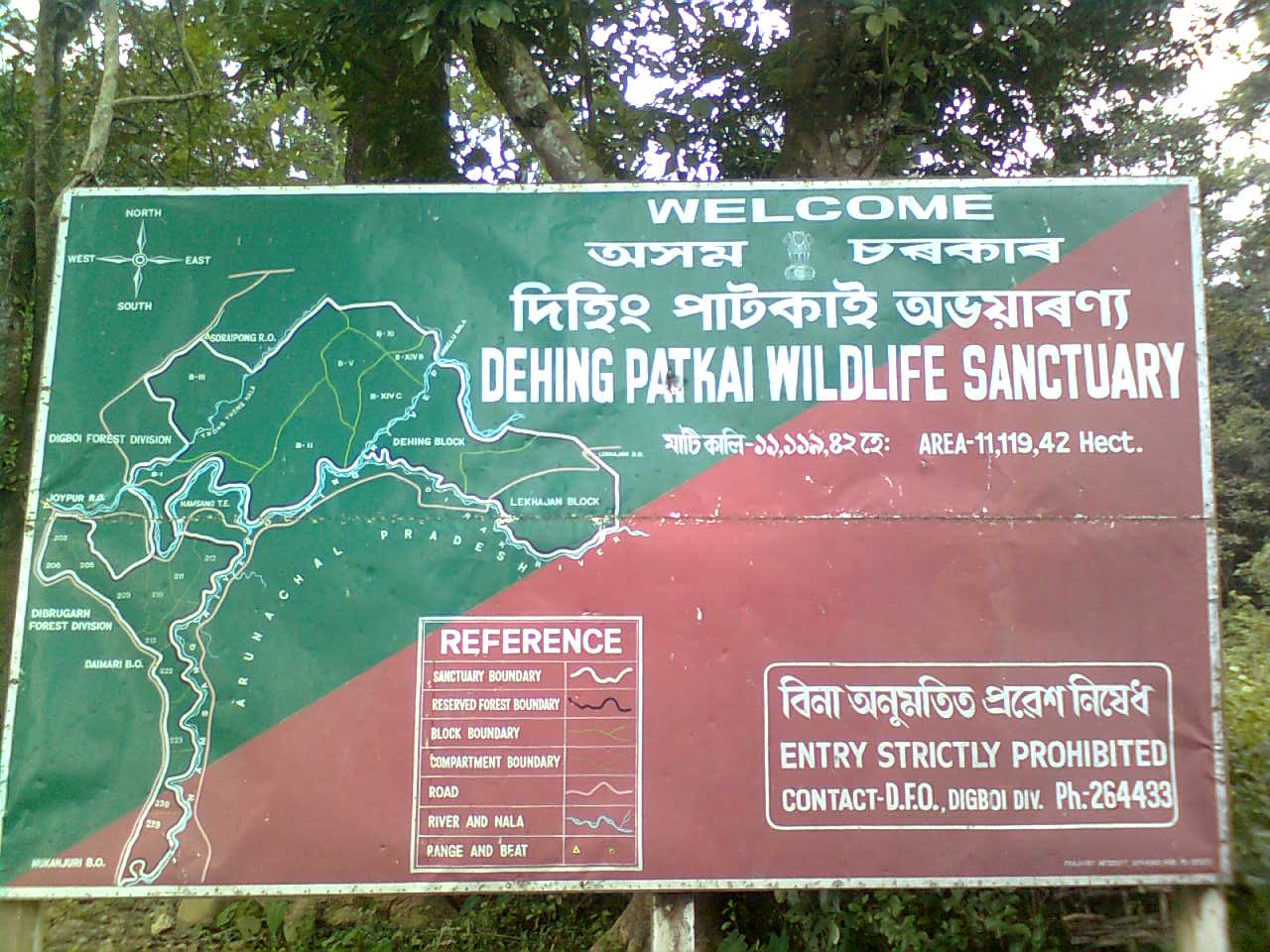
Entrance of Dihing Patkai national park

Dehing Patkai National Park harbours the largest stretch of lowland rainforests in India. Dehing Patkai Wildlife Sanctuary was declared as Dehing Patkai Elephant Reserve under Project Elephant. Dehing-Patkai as a potential wildlife sanctuary was identified in late 1980s during a primate survey as "Upper Dehing Wildlife Sanctuary". Subsequently, during a study on white-winged wood duck in early 1990s, it was discovered as a globally important site for this duck and recommended to be upgraded to "Upper Dehing National Park". It was declared a wildlife sanctuary on 13 June 2004. On 13 December 2020, the Government of Assam upgraded it into a national park. On 9 June 2021, the Forest Department of Assam officially notified it as a national park.

== Climate ==
The climate of the region is mostly tropical with an annual rainfall of more than 4,000 mm (160 in). Monthly precipitation is at least 60 mm.

== Wildlife ==
=== Fauna ===
Being a rainforest, this National Park is very rich in biodiversity. It is an ideal habitat for non-human primates. The species are slow loris, Assamese macaque, stump-tailed macaque, pig-tailed macaque, Rhesus monkey, capped langur and hoolock gibbon. So far, nearly 50 mammal species, 47 reptile species and 310 butterfly species have been recorded. Other noteworthy mammals found in this national park includes Chinese pangolin, dhole, Himalayan black bear, Malayan sun bear, crab-eating mongoose, small-toothed palm civet, binturong, jungle cat, leopard cat, Asian golden cat, marbled cat, Bengal tiger, leopard, clouded leopard, Asian elephant, gaur, red serow, sambar, barking deer, Red giant flying squirrel, Malayan porcupine and Asiatic brush-tailed porcupine.

==== Avifauna ====
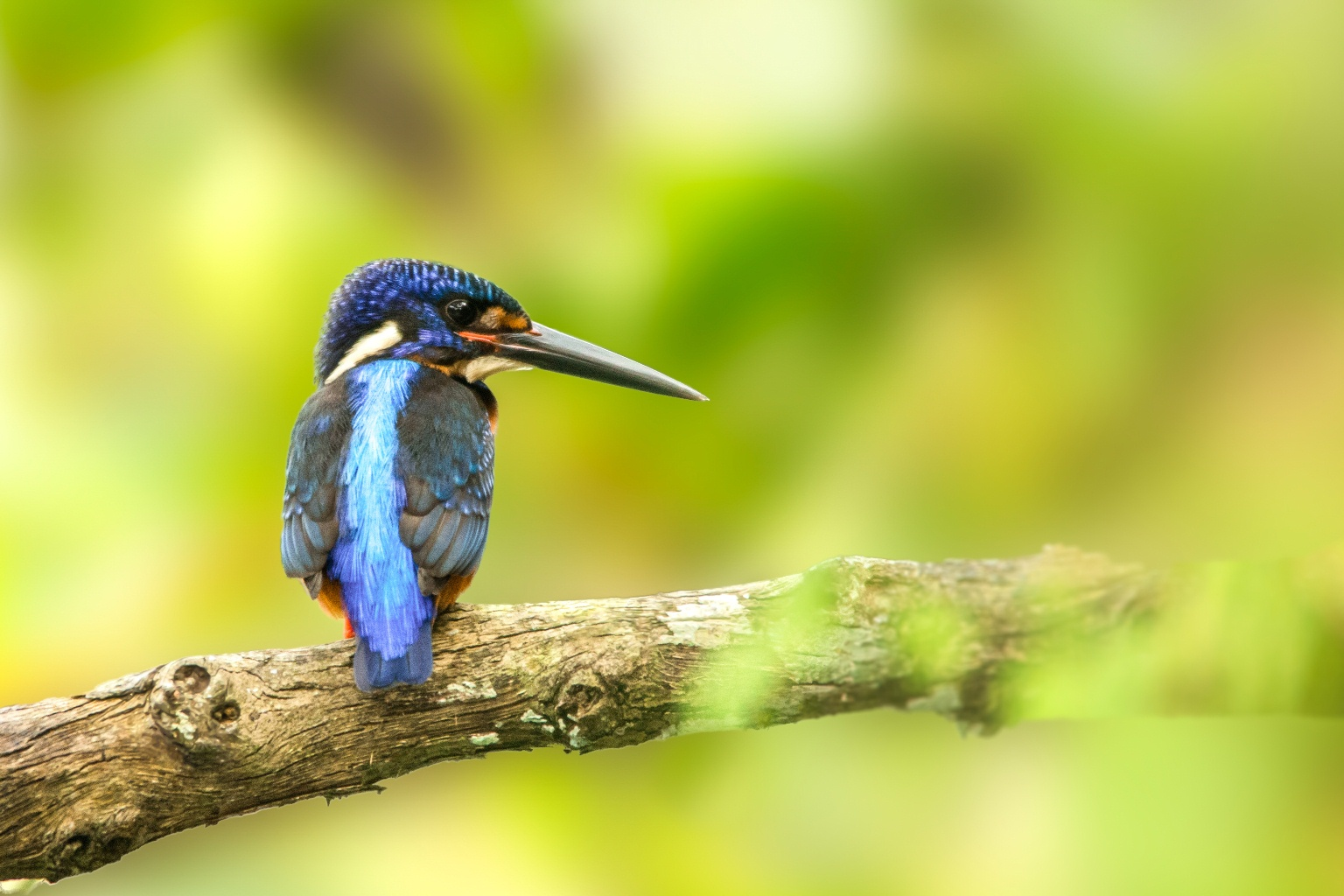
A Blue-eared kingfisher photographed inside the wildlife sanctuary

Dihing Patkai rainforest harbours about 293 bird species, belonging to 174 genera and 51 families. The majority is resident (63.7%), some are winter visitors (23.1% ), and very few are summer visitors (2.5%). About 10.7% are altitudinal migrants, coming mainly from the higher reaches of the western, central and eastern Himalayas. Avifauna includes white-cheeked partridge, kalij pheasant, grey peacock pheasant, Oriental darter, lesser adjutant, white-winged wood duck, pied falconet, slender-billed vulture, white-backed vulture, greater spotted eagle, besra, black baza, osprey, pale-capped pigeon, green imperial pigeon, mountain imperial pigeon, red-breasted parakeet, Oriental bay owl, tawny fish owl, great pied hornbill, brown hornbill, wreathed hornbill, yellow-vented warbler, hill myna and scaly thrush.

=== Flora ===
The different trees of this four-layered rainforest are laden with many exotic species of orchids and bromeliads. There is an abundance of ferns, epiphytes, wild banana, orchids, arums, climbers and lianas in this humid forest habitat. Some of the important tree species found in this forest area are – Hollong, Mekai, Dhuna, Uriyam, Nahar, Chamkothal, Bher, Hollock, Nahor, Ou–tenga (elephant apple), different species of Ficus spp. etc. The towering Hollong tree which is also the State Tree of Assam dominates the emergent layer of this rainforest.

The forest type according of Champion and Seth's classification is Upper Assam valley tropical evergreen forest.

The important species of over wood are Dipterocarpus macrocarpus, Mesua ferrea, Castanopsis indica, Shorea assamica, Vatica lanceaefolia, Amoora wallichii, Dysoxylum binectiferum etc. The other species found in the understorey are Garcinia lanceifolia, Michelia muni, Baccaurea sapida, Bischofia javanica, Myristica limifolia etc. The shrub and herb layer has Glochidion spp., Alpinia spp., Mallotus philippensis, wild banana, tree fern, pepper etc. The ground cover mainly has Melastoma, Leea and other species.

== Ethnic groups ==
The Dihing Patkai Forest region has a rich cultural heritage. There are more than a dozen different ethnic groups living in the area including the indigenous communities, particularly Tai Phake, Khamyang, Khampti, Singpho, Nocte, Chutia, Ahom, Kaibarta, Moran, Burmese, and Nepali people. Tea-tribes were brought by the British to work in the tea plantations.

Map of Dehing Patkai National Park
