= Brown hornbill =

The brown hornbill has been split into two species:

- Austen's brown hornbill, Anorrhinus austeni
- Tickell's brown hornbill or rusty-cheeked) hornbill, Anorrhinus tickelli
