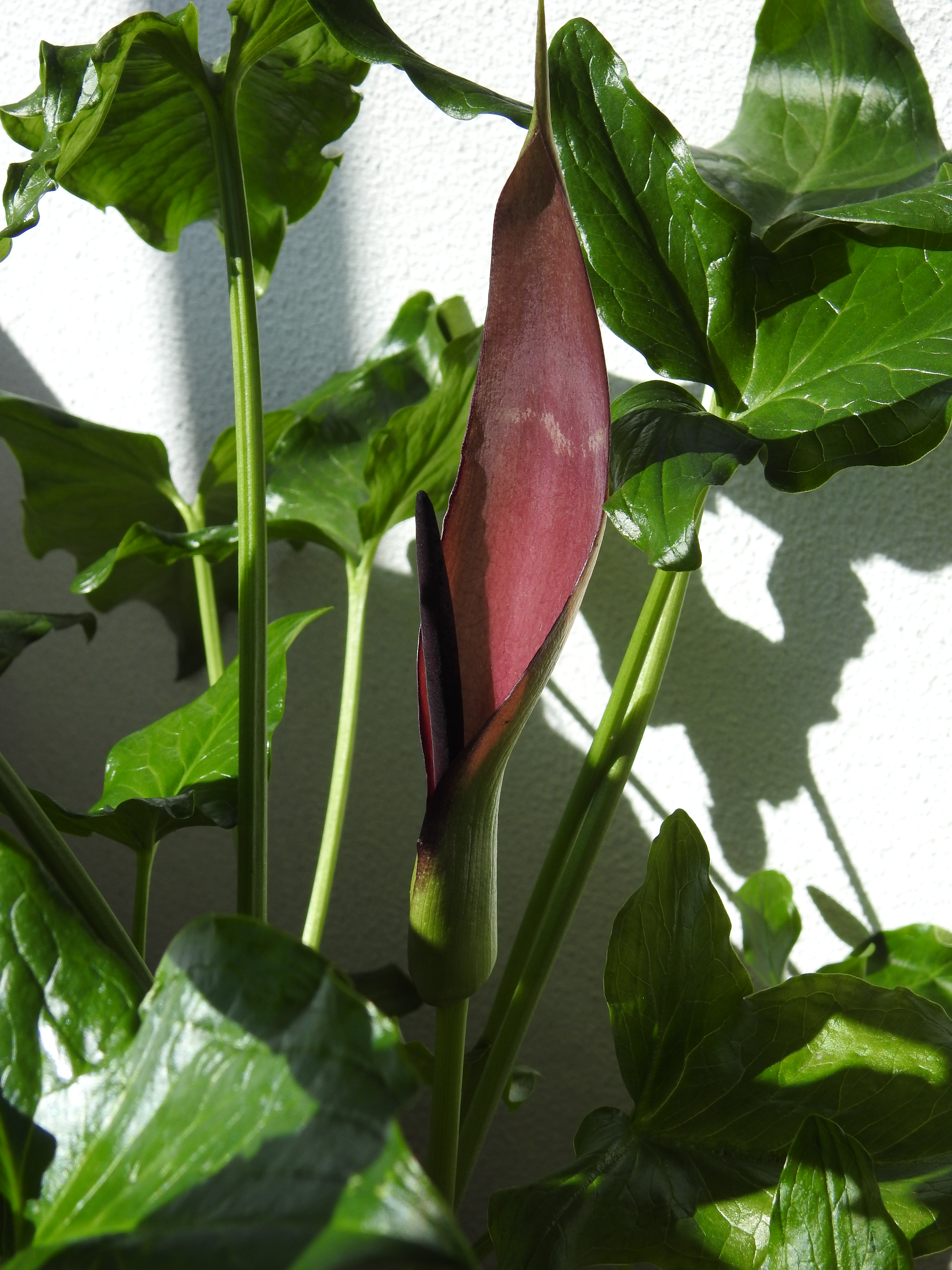
- Arum sintenisii in cultivation

Scientific classification
- Kingdom: Plantae
- Clade: Embryophytes
- Clade: Tracheophytes
- Clade: Angiosperms
- Clade: Monocots
- Order: Alismatales
- Family: Araceae
- Genus: Arum
- Species: A. sintenisii

Binomial name
- Arum sintenisii (Engl.) P.C.Boyce

Synonyms
- Arum orientale subsp. elongatum var. sintenisii Engler; Arum orientale subsp. sintenisii (Engl.) P.C.Boyce

= Arum sintenisii =

Species of flowering plant

Arum sintenisii, known as Sintenis arum, is a flowering plant species in the family Araceae.

== Description ==
Arum sintenisii is a tuberous herbs that spreads clonally through discoid horizontally-oriented tubers. Flowers are borne on a spadix, partially enclosed in a green spathe with a purple internal lining.

Germination is epigeal.

== Habitat ==
It grows in uncultivated Olea europaea groves at altitudes of 50 to 200 meters (160 to 660 ft) near Kythrea in northern Cyprus. It was recently reported from southwestern Turkey.

== Taxonomy ==
Within the genus Arum, it belongs to subgenus Arum, section Dioscoridea, and subsection Hygrophila. It was previously thought to be a variety or subspecies of Arum orientale in subsection Dischroochiton, but recent studies support a closer relationship with Arum hygrophilum. A. sintenisii differs from A. orientale in the smell (sweet in A. sintenisii, foetid in A. orientale) and presentation of the inflorescence (produced at leaf level in A. sintenisii, below leaves in A. orientale), and the two were recognized as distinct in 1995. A. sintenisii also differs in its larger size. A. sintenisii has also been confused with A. hygrophilum; many records of A. hygrophilum from Cyprus are likely misidentifications of this species.

A. sintenisii is diploid, with a chromosome count of 2n = 28.

== Uses ==
=== Cultivated ===
Arum sintenisii is cultivated as an ornamental plant, and is reported to survive mild winters in South East England.
