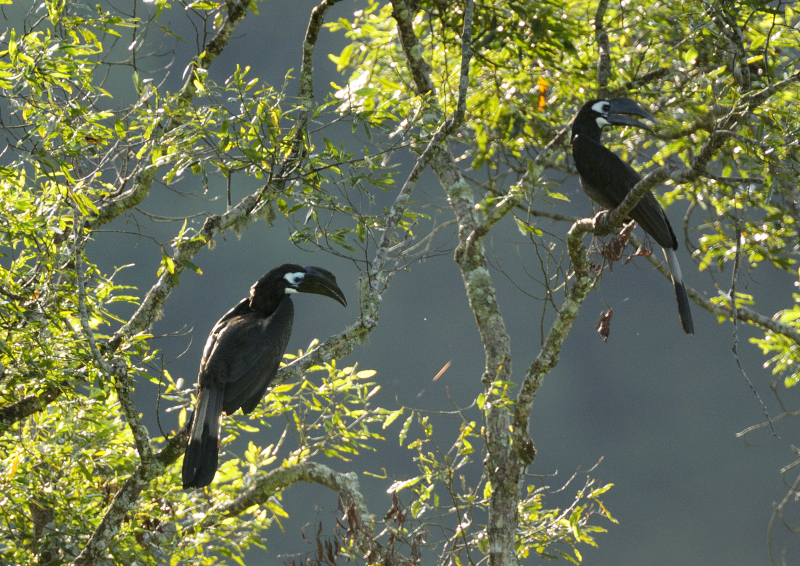
- Bushy-crested hornbill (Anorrhinus galeritus)

Scientific classification
- Kingdom: Animalia
- Phylum: Chordata
- Class: Aves
- Order: Bucerotiformes
- Family: Bucerotidae
- Genus: Anorrhinus; Reichenbach, 1849

Type species
- Buceros galeritus Temminck, 1831

Species
- See text.

Synonyms
- Ptilolaemus

= Anorrhinus =

Genus of birds

Anorrhinus is a genus of hornbills (family Bucerotidae) found in forests of Southeast Asia (just barely extending into adjacent parts of India and China). They are social and typically seen in groups, but only the dominant pair are believed to breed, while other group members act as helpers.

== Taxonomy ==
This genus is sometimes limited to the bushy-crested hornbill, in which case the two remaining species, which are sometimes considered conspecific, are placed in the genus Ptilolaemus. A molecular phylogenetic study published in 2013 found that Anorrhinus was sister to a clade containing the genera Anthracoceros and Ocyceros.

The genus contains three species:

Image	Scientific name	Common name	Distribution
	Anorrhinus austeni	Austen's brown hornbill	northeastern India and south to Vietnam and northern Thailand
	Anorrhinus tickelli	Tickell's brown hornbill or rusty-cheeked hornbill	Burma and adjacent western Thailand
	Anorrhinus galeritus	Bushy-crested hornbill	Brunei, Indonesia, Malaysia, Myanmar, and Thailand
