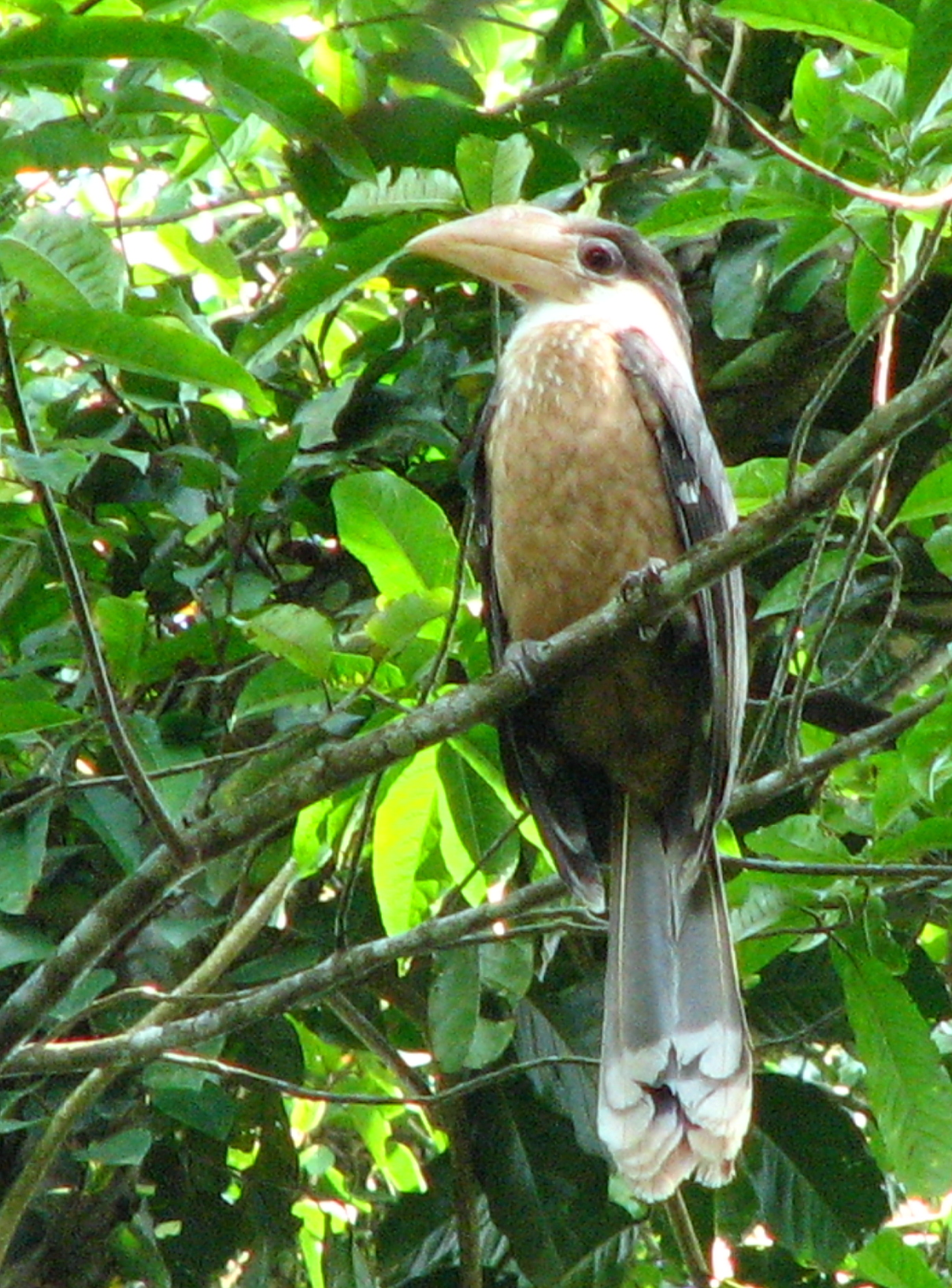
- Male

Conservation status
- Near Threatened (IUCN 3.1)
- CITES Appendix II

Scientific classification
- Kingdom: Animalia
- Phylum: Chordata
- Class: Aves
- Order: Bucerotiformes
- Family: Bucerotidae
- Genus: Anorrhinus
- Species: A. austeni

Binomial name
- Anorrhinus austeni Jerdon, 1872
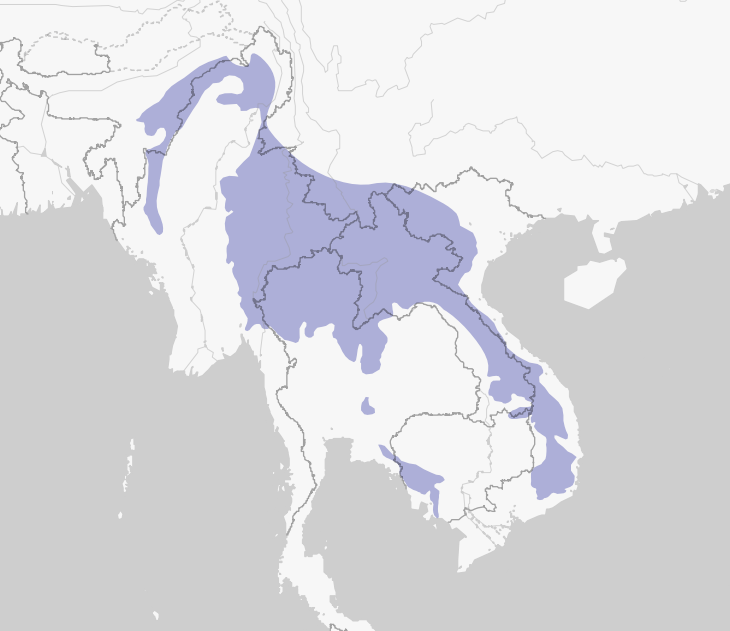
- Extant (resident)

Synonyms
- Anorrhinus tickeli austeni, Ptilolaemus tickeli austeni, Ptilolaemus austeni

= Austen's brown hornbill =

Species of bird

Austen's brown hornbill (Anorrhinus austeni), also known as the white-throated brown hornbill or brown hornbill, is a medium-sized species of hornbill found in forests from northeastern India to Vietnam and northern Thailand. It is rare throughout its range and is threatened by habitat loss and fragmentation.

== Description ==
Austen's brown hornbill has dark brown upperparts (back, wings, and tail) with a lighter-coloured belly, cheeks, and throat. It has a white-tipped tail and wings and has blue-coloured bare skin around the eyes. The species is sexually dimorphic. The bill and casque are ivory white in females and cream-coloured in males. Females have a grey-brown throat, belly, and cheeks, whereas males have a whitish throat and cheeks with a reddish belly. The female also has a yellow wash below the eye. Juveniles look similar to adult males but have a short yellow bill, orange skin around the eye, and pale-brown feather tips. The male weighs 710–900 g (25–32 oz) and is 73–80 cm (29–31 in) long. The female is smaller.

== Taxonomy ==
Thomas C. Jerdon formally described Austen's brown hornbill as Anorrhinus austeni in 1872 in Asalu, Cachar Hills, Assam, India in The Ibis. The genus name comes from the Greek prefix ano- meaning above and rhinus meaning nose. The species is thought to be named after the naturalist Henry Haversham Godwin-Austen.

Austen's brown hornbill was once categorized as a subspecies of Tickell's brown hornbill and both Austen's and Tickell's brown hornbills were in the genus Ptilolaemus. The subspecies classification of Austen's brown hornbill was the accepted taxonomy from 1945–2003 but more recent genetic studies have placed Austen's brown hornbill and Tickell's brown hornbill as sister species both in the genus Anorrhinus. The bushy-crested hornbill is the only other species in the Anorrhinus genus.

The population in Thailand and Indochina is sometimes treated as a race called indochinensis.

== Distribution and habitat ==
Austen's brown hornbill is found in northeastern India, central and northern Thailand, Myanmar, Laos, Vietnam, Cambodia, and historically China but there have been no recent reports. It is rare in most of its range and found mainly in national parks and sanctuaries where forests are protected such as the Patkai Wildlife Sanctuary and Namdapha Tiger Reserve. It is common in Laos but the population is declining.

It lives mainly in dense evergreen forests in lowlands and foothills, and is less commonly found in deciduous forests. It has been observed up to 1,000 m (3,300 ft) in India, 1,500 m (4,900 ft) in Southeast Asia, and 1,800 m (5,900 ft) in Tibet. It moves through the forest at or below canopy level, but uses all canopy layers equally.

== Behaviour ==
=== Vocalizations ===
Austen's brown hornbill is a noisy bird. It makes loud screams, croaks, chisels, low cackles, squeals, and a nasal "ank-ank-ank" call. It sounds similar to the Malabar pied hornbill and the bushy-crested hornbill but less harsh. It often does noisy contact calling when feeding.

=== Diet ===
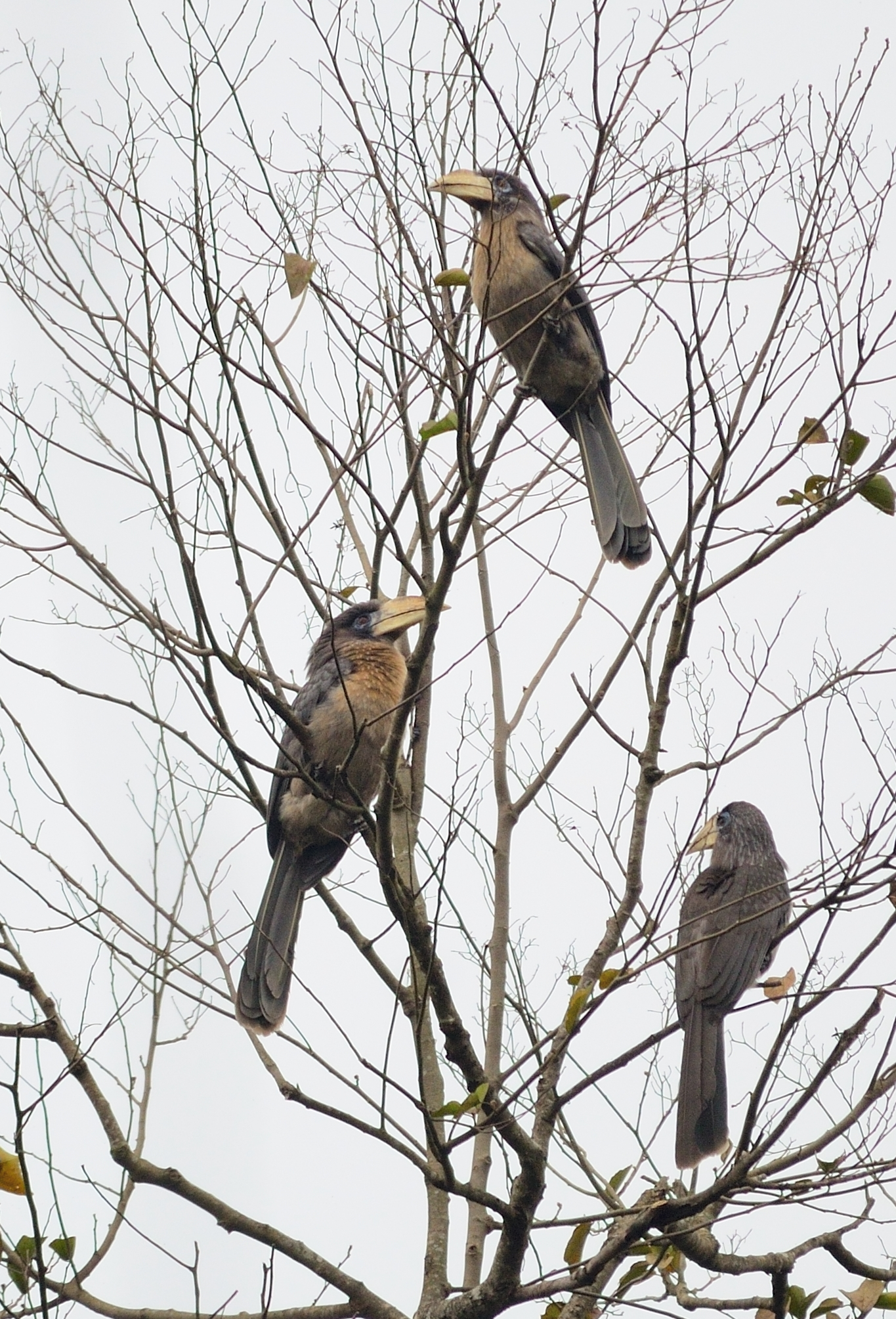
Group in Namdapha National Park, India

Austen's brown hornbill eats fruits and small animals. The percentage of animal matter in its diet ranges from 40–79% and includes arthropods, molluscs, earthworms, reptiles, bats, and bird eggs and chicks. The percentage of fruit matter ranges from 20–60% with a large portion of that being figs. Compared to other hornbill species, Austen's brown hornbill is an animal specialist and spends more time hunting animals below the canopy. The proportion of various food items and amount of food consumed overall changes throughout the phases of the breeding season.

=== Social groups ===
They live in groups of about 2-15 birds, on average 6, but up to 80 birds have been seen roosting together. These groups are territorial and sedentary with small home ranges of 4.3–5.9 km^{2} (1.7–2.3 sq mi). Non-breeding offspring remain in a social group with their parents.

=== Reproduction ===
Austen's brown hornbill is a monogamous, cooperative breeder. A dominant male-female breeding pair has an average of two helpers but the number of helpers can range from zero to five. The helpers are the non-breeding offspring of the pair and are mostly adult males but sometimes juveniles. Helpers bring food to the female and chicks and defend the nest from predators, birds of the same species, and other closely related species. Food is delivered by regurgitation. Austen's brown hornbill nests in natural tree cavities or old holes made by woodpeckers about 5–7 m (16–23 ft) off the ground, sometimes up to 27 m (89 ft). Tree species used for nesting include magnolia, hollong, Anthoshorea assamica, and Artocarpus chama. Breeding is initiated in February–March depending on location, usually before the monsoon period. The main breeding season coincides with the peak availability of non-fig fruits. Like other hornbills, the female seals herself in the nesting cavity and moults her flight feathers. The average clutch size is two, rarely up to five. The incubation period is 24–30 days and the nesting period is 57–62 days. The female and chicks fledge at the same time in May–July depending on location. The whole nesting cycle lasts 73–112 days.

== Threats and conservation ==
Austen's brown hornbill is listed as Near Threatened on the IUCN red list of threatened species. It faces threats from logging, expanding roads and settlements, and hunting. It is hunted by several tribes for the caseque, meat, fat and feathers. While hunting is not usually done during the breeding season, winter hunting is still a threat to Austen's brown hornbill populations. There is evidence that Austen's brown hornbill can live in logged forests but nesting attempts are less successful. Human disruption disproportionately affects Austen's brown hornbill, with populations mainly found in protected areas. The probability of habitat use outside of protected areas is lower in Austen's brown hornbill than other hornbills in the same habitat range.

The IUCN has put forth recommendations for the conservation of Austen's brown hornbill. They suggest conducting new surveys in areas like Myanmar and Laos where population sizes are less known, and repeating surveys across the distribution to monitor the change in population size. To decrease hunting pressure, they suggest raising awareness of the conservation status of Austen's brown hornbill. Additionally, they suggest studies to determine habitat requirements to inform protected area designation.
