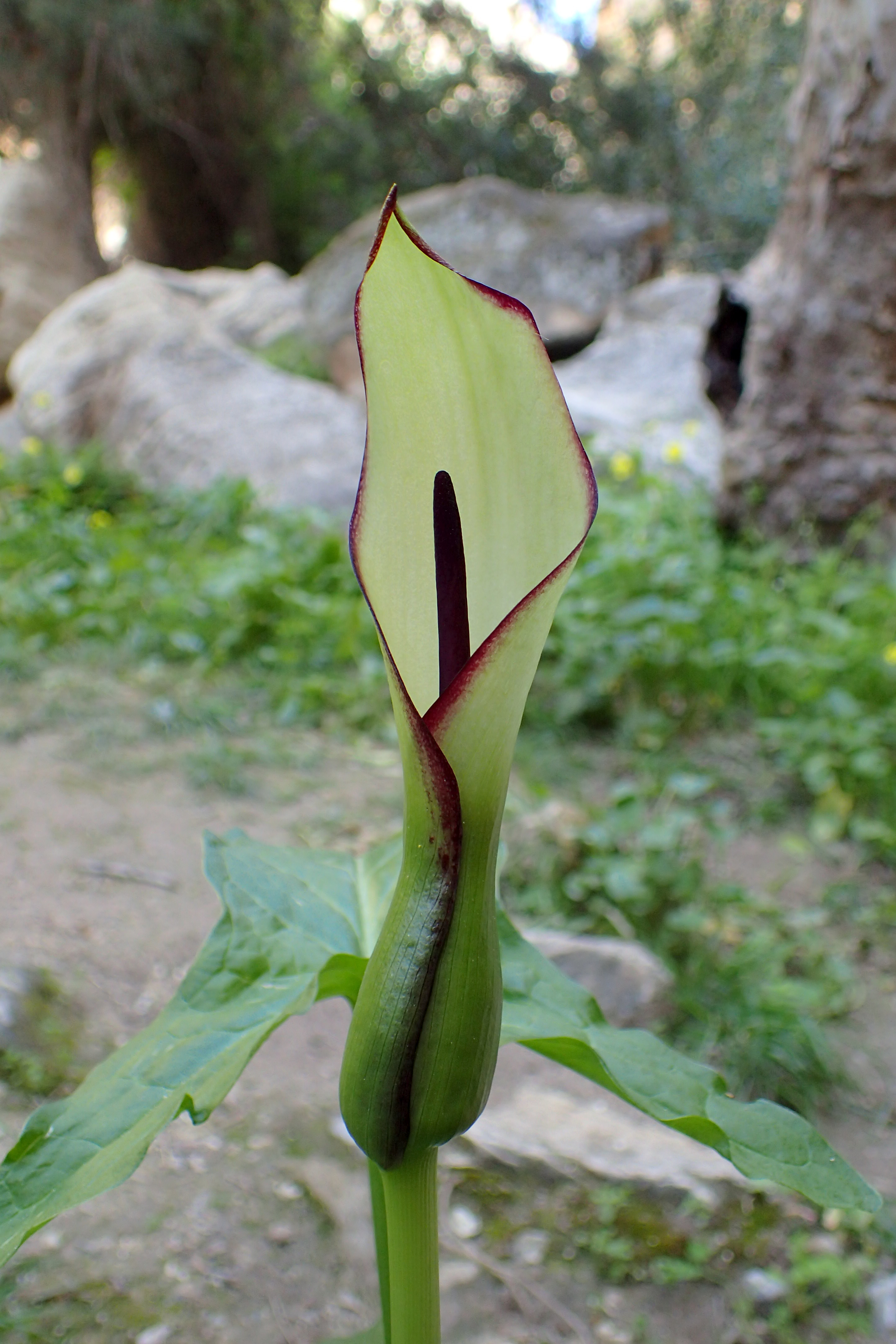

Conservation status
- Near Threatened (IUCN 3.1)

Scientific classification
- Kingdom: Plantae
- Clade: Embryophytes
- Clade: Tracheophytes
- Clade: Angiosperms
- Clade: Monocots
- Order: Alismatales
- Family: Araceae
- Genus: Arum
- Species: A. hygrophilum

Binomial name
- Arum hygrophilum Boiss.

Synonyms
- Arum longicyrrhum Schott; Arum albinervium Kotschy ex Engl.

= Arum hygrophilum =

Species of flowering plant

Arum hygrophilum is a species of flowering plant in the family Araceae. It has a disjunct distribution, found in northern and central Israel, western Jordan, Lebanon, southwestern Syria, eastern Cyprus, western Turkey, and northeastern Morocco.

It is threatened by agricultural development and urbanization.

== Description ==
By relative inflorescence height, Arum species are divided into "cryptic" species, whose inflorescences are borne on a short peduncle amid or below the leaves, and "flag" species, whose inflorescences are above leaf level at the end of long peduncles. A. hygrophilum is a flag species.

The species has a white inner spathe, which has purple accents. The small spadix is a dark purple color.

== Bibliography ==
- Rivera, Diego; Obón, Concepción; Heinrich, Michael; Inocencio, Cristina; Verde, Alonso; Fajardo, José (2006). "Gathered Mediterranean food plants – Ethnobotanical investigations and historical development". Local Mediterranean Food Plants and Nutraceuticals. pp. 18–74. doi:10.1159/000095207. ISBN 978-3-318-01352-8.
- Gibernau, Marc; Macquart, David; Przetak, Gilles (2004). "Pollination in the genus Arum – a review" (PDF). Aroideana. 27: 148–166. ISSN 0197-4033.
- Kite, Geoffrey C.; et al. (2000). "Inflorescence odours and pollinators of Arum and Amorphophallus (Araceae)" (PDF). Reproductive Biology in Systematics, Conservation and Economic Botany. pp. 295–315. ISBN 1-900347-62-8.
- Hruby, Johann (1912). "Le genre Arum: Aperçu systématique avec considérations spéciales sur les relations phylogénétiques des formes" [The Genus Arum: A Systematic Overview with Special Considerations on the Phylogenetic Relations of its Forms]. Bulletin de la Société botanique de Genève II (in French) (4). Geneva: 113–160. ISSN 0366-3108.
