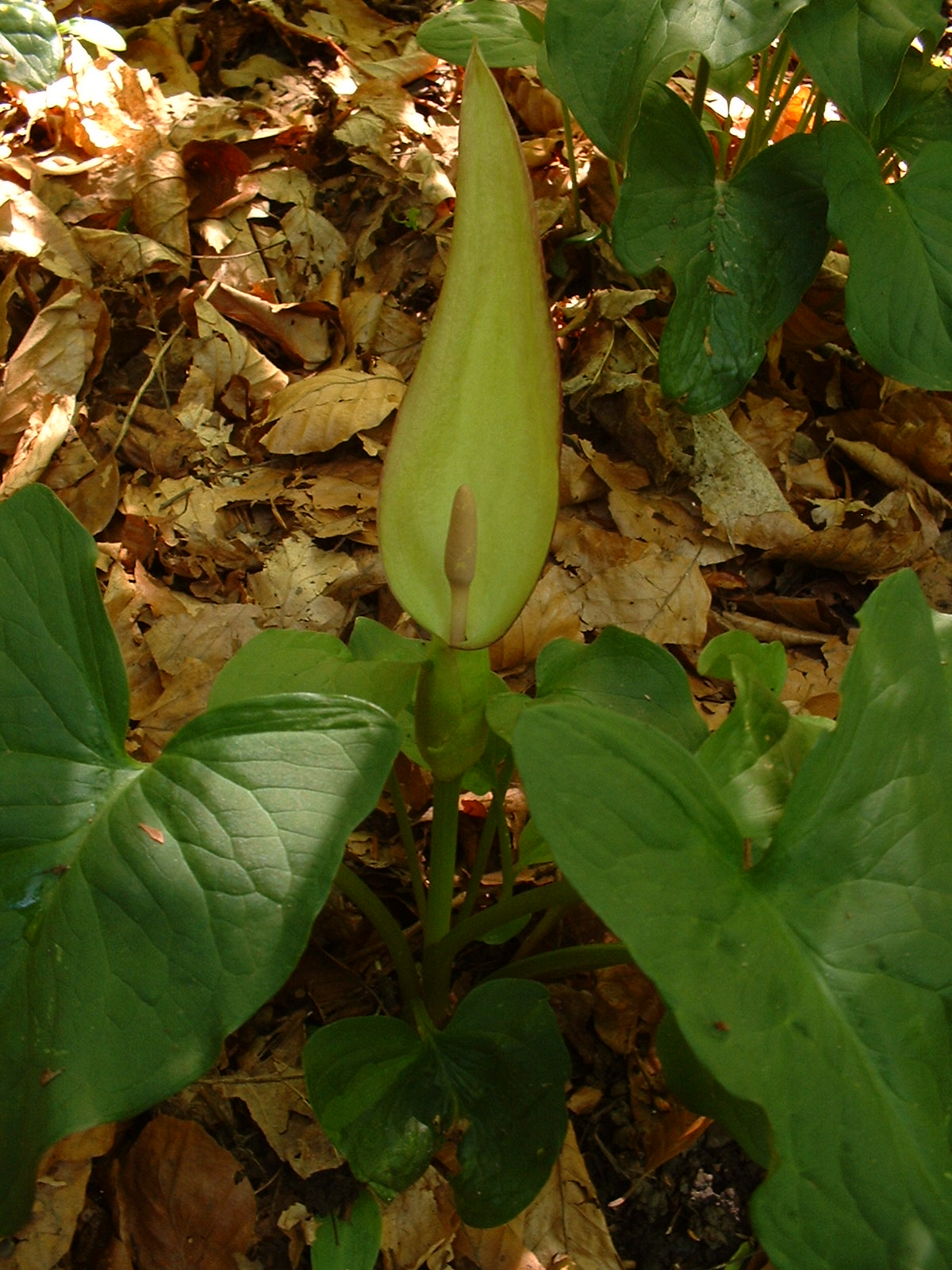

Scientific classification
- Kingdom: Plantae
- Clade: Tracheophytes
- Clade: Angiosperms
- Clade: Monocots
- Order: Alismatales
- Family: Araceae
- Genus: Arum
- Species: A. orientale

Binomial name
- Arum orientale M.Bieb., 1808

= Arum orientale =

Species of plant

Arum orientale is a woodland plant species of the family Araceae. It is found in southeastern Europe as far west as Vienna and in Turkey. Its primary range is Romania, Bulgaria, and southern Ukraine.

== Description ==
The plain green leaves of A. orientale appear in autumn followed in late spring by the flowers borne on a poker-shaped inflorescence called a spadix, which is partially enclosed in a pale green spathe or leaf-like hood, often with purple spotting. The interior of the spathe can be greenish or a dull purple to brownish color. The flowers are hidden from sight, clustered at the base of the spadix with a ring of female flowers at the bottom and a ring of male flowers above them. Above the male flowers is a ring of hairs forming an insect trap. Insects are attracted to the spadix by its foul odor and a temperature warmer than the ambient temperature. The insects are trapped beneath the ring of hairs and are dusted with pollen by the male flowers before escaping and carrying the pollen to the spadices of other plants, where they pollinate the female flowers. The spadix is a mid-to pale purple.

In late spring and early summer, the lower ring of (female) flowers forms a cluster of bright red berries which remain after the spathe and other leaves have withered away. These attractive red to orange berries are extremely poisonous. The berries contain oxalates of saponins which have needle-shaped crystals which irritate the skin, mouth, tongue, and throat, and result in swelling of the throat, difficulty breathing, burning pain, and upset stomach. However, their acrid taste, coupled with the almost immediate tingling sensation in the mouth when consumed, means that large amounts are rarely taken, and serious harm is unusual.

In areas where both A. orientale and A. maculatum are found, they are easily confused. A. orientale, however, has a much more limited distribution than A. maculatum.

Several characteristics set the two species apart including the tuber, which is horizontal with A. maculatum but discoid with A. orientale. The coloring of the interior of the spathe is another marked characteristic of A. orientale

== Habitat ==
Throughout the area it is found in deciduous woodland or on the edges of coniferous woodland, preferring partial shade and somewhat moist conditions.

== Taxonomy ==
Within the genus, it belongs to subgenus Arum, subsection Dischroochiton.

A. orientale has a chromosome count of 2n = 28.

== Bibliography ==
- Łuczaj, Łukasz; Emre, Gizem (2025-02-13). "Lords-and-Ladies (Arum) as Food in Eurasia: A Review". Plants. 14 (4): 577. Bibcode:2025Plnts..14..577L. doi:10.3390/plants14040577. eISSN 2223-7747. PMC 11859539.
- Rivera, Diego; Obón, Concepción; Heinrich, Michael; Inocencio, Cristina; Verde, Alonso; Fajardo, José (2006). "Gathered Mediterranean food plants – Ethnobotanical investigations and historical development". Local Mediterranean Food Plants and Nutraceuticals. pp. 18–74. doi:10.1159/000095207. ISBN 978-3-318-01352-8.
- Kite, Geoffrey C.; et al. (2000). "Inflorescence odours and pollinators of Arum and Amorphophallus (Araceae)" (PDF). Reproductive Biology in Systematics, Conservation and Economic Botany. pp. 295–315. ISBN 1900347628.
- Hruby, Johann (1912). "Le genre Arum: Aperçu systématique avec considérations spéciales sur les relations phylogénétiques des formes" [The Genus Arum: A Systematic Overview with Special Considerations on the Phylogenetic Relations of its Forms]. Bulletin de la Société botanique de Genève II (in French) (4). Geneva: 113–160. ISSN 0366-3108.
