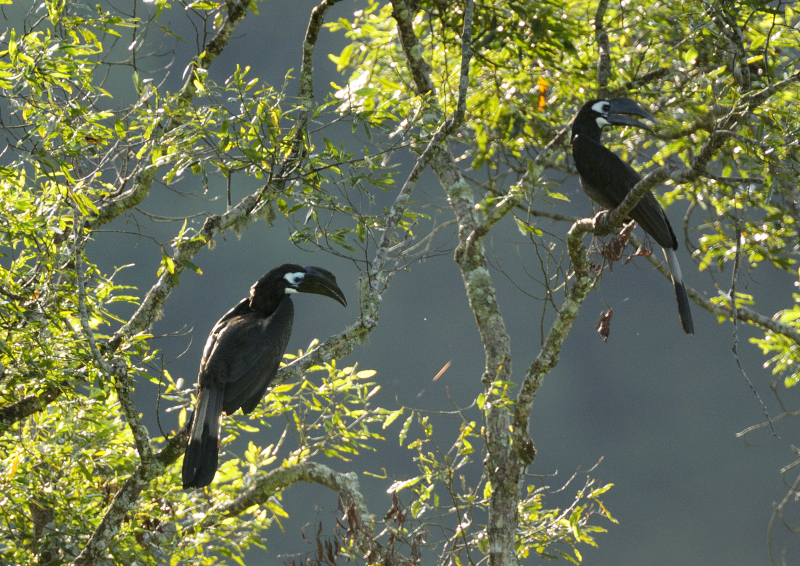

Conservation status
- Near Threatened (IUCN 3.1)
- CITES Appendix II

Scientific classification
- Kingdom: Animalia
- Phylum: Chordata
- Class: Aves
- Order: Bucerotiformes
- Family: Bucerotidae
- Genus: Anorrhinus
- Species: A. galeritus

Binomial name
- Anorrhinus galeritus (Temminck, 1831)

= Bushy-crested hornbill =

Species of bird

The bushy-crested hornbill (Anorrhinus galeritus) is a bird in the hornbill family. It is found in Brunei, Indonesia, Malaysia, Myanmar, and Thailand. Its natural habitat is subtropical or tropical moist lowland forests.

It lives in groups.

Females have a unique nesting behavior in which they stay alone in a mud-covered tree hole during incubation and are fed by other hornbills from outside the nest.

== Diet ==
The bushy-crested hornbill mainly eats fruit: several different species of figs, Indian Mast Tree (Polyalthia lateriflora), Oncosperma horridum, Canarium megalanthum, Canthiumera glabra, Zuccarinia macrophylla, Myristica sp., Horsfieldia sp., champak (Magnolia champaca), Dysoxylum sp., Fibraurea tinctoria, Endocomia macrocoma, and Alseodaphne falcata.

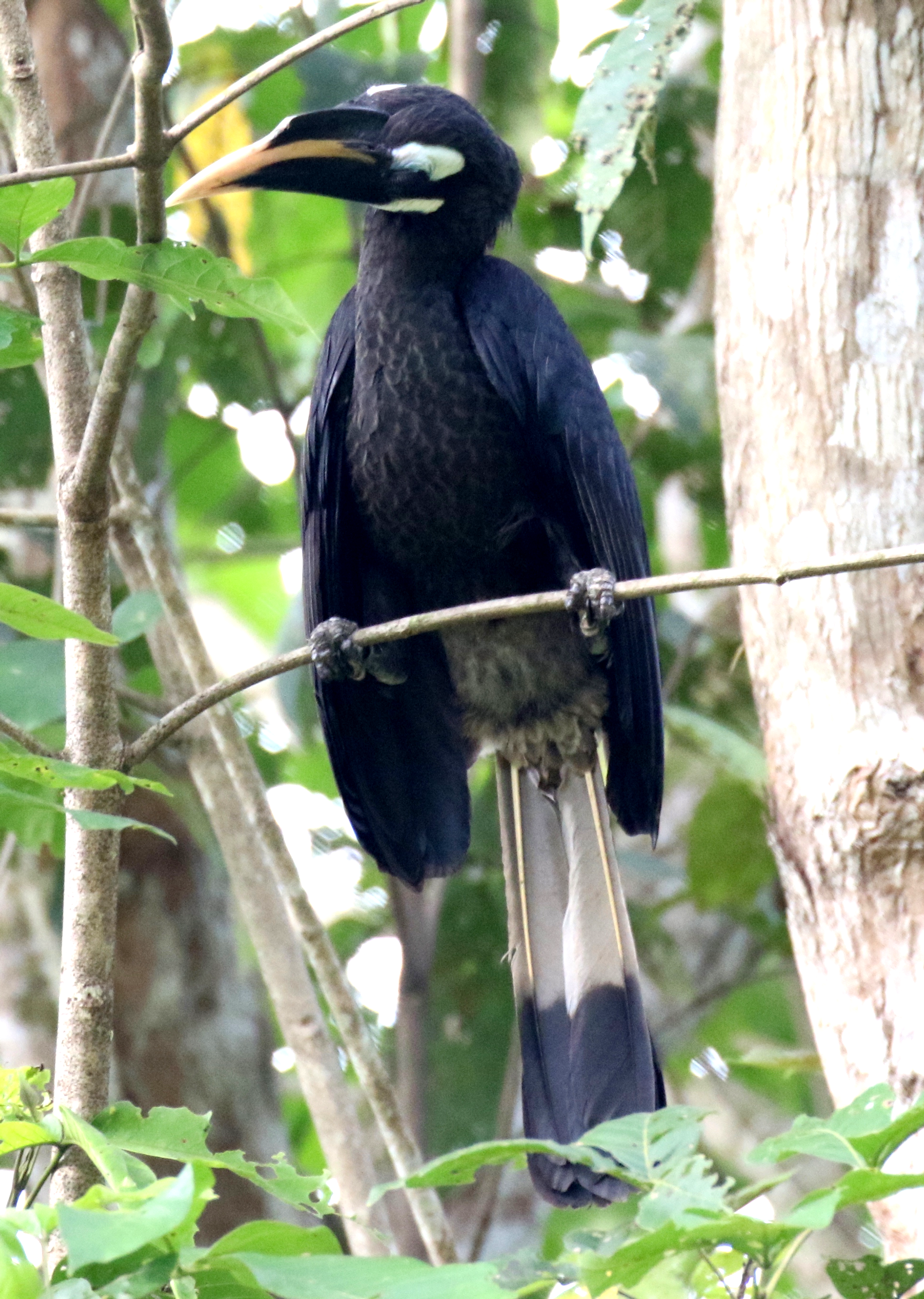
Sukau Rainforest Lodge, Kinabatangen River - Sabah, Borneo - Malaysia

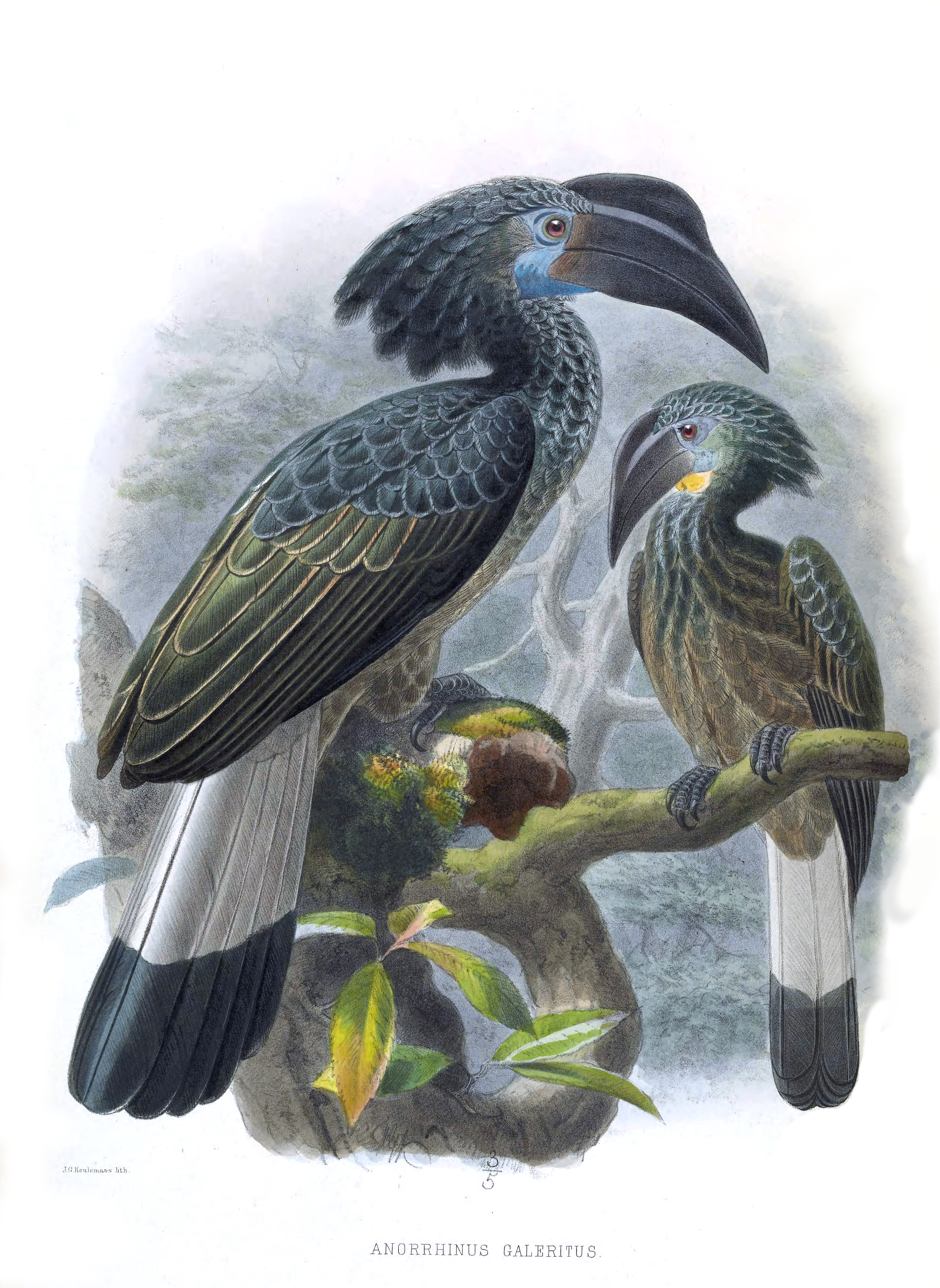
