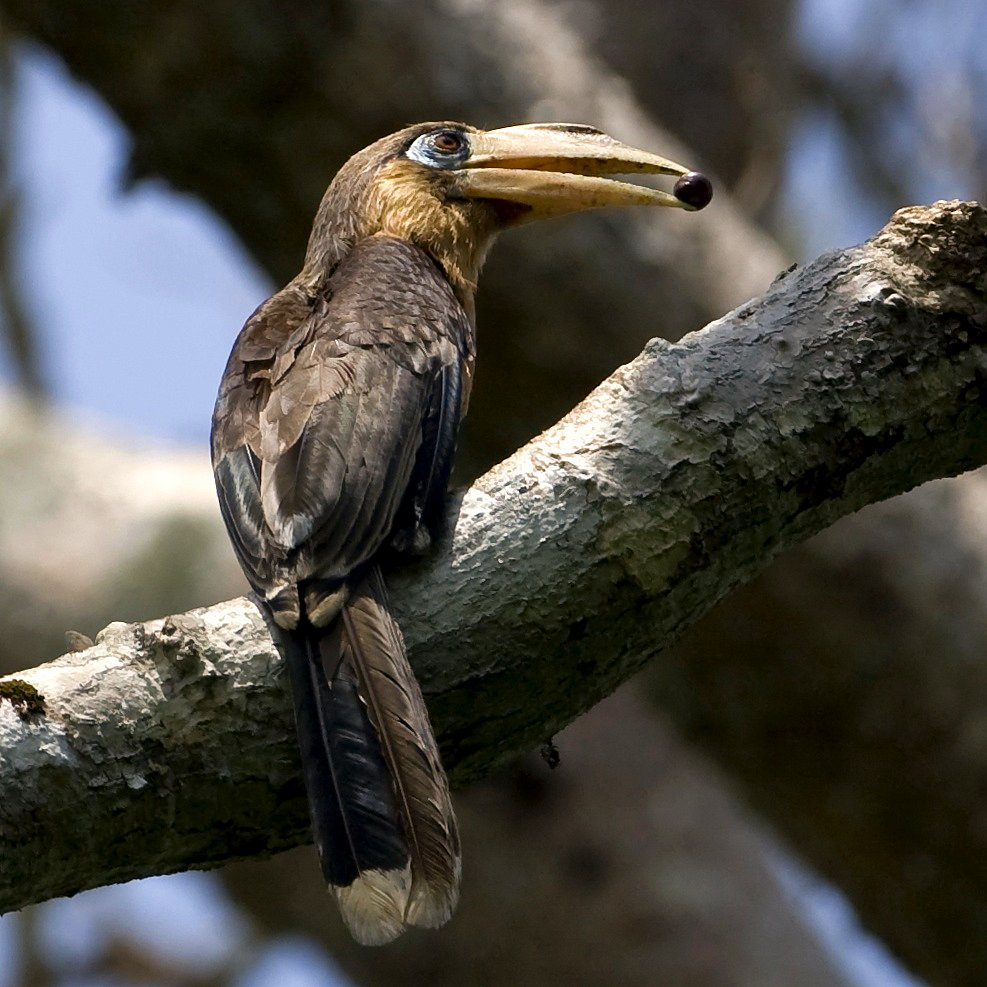
- Kaeng Krachan, Thailand

Conservation status
- Near Threatened (IUCN 3.1)
- CITES Appendix II (CITES)

Scientific classification
- Kingdom: Animalia
- Phylum: Chordata
- Class: Aves
- Order: Bucerotiformes
- Family: Bucerotidae
- Genus: Anorrhinus
- Species: A. tickelli

Binomial name
- Anorrhinus tickelli (Blyth, 1855)

Synonyms
- Ptilolaemus tickelli

= Tickell's brown hornbill =

Species of bird

Tickell's brown hornbill (Anorrhinus tickelli), also known as the rusty-cheeked hornbill, is a species of hornbill found in forests in Burma and adjacent western Thailand. Austen's brown hornbill is sometimes considered as a subspecies of Tickell's brown hornbill.

== Description ==
At about 60–65 cm (24–26 in) in length, it is a medium-sized hornbill, dark brown above and red-brown below. The male has brighter rufous cheeks and throat. Juveniles of both sexes resemble adult males.

== Habitat ==
It inhabits evergreen and deciduous hill forest from foothills to 1500 m.

It breeds co-cooperatively, in groups.

Habitat loss to logging and agriculture is known to be prevalent within its range.

The binomial commemorates the ornithologist Samuel Tickell.

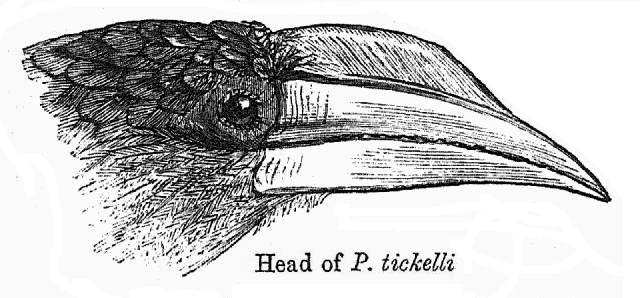
Illustration of head from W. T. Blanford's Fauna of British India: Birds

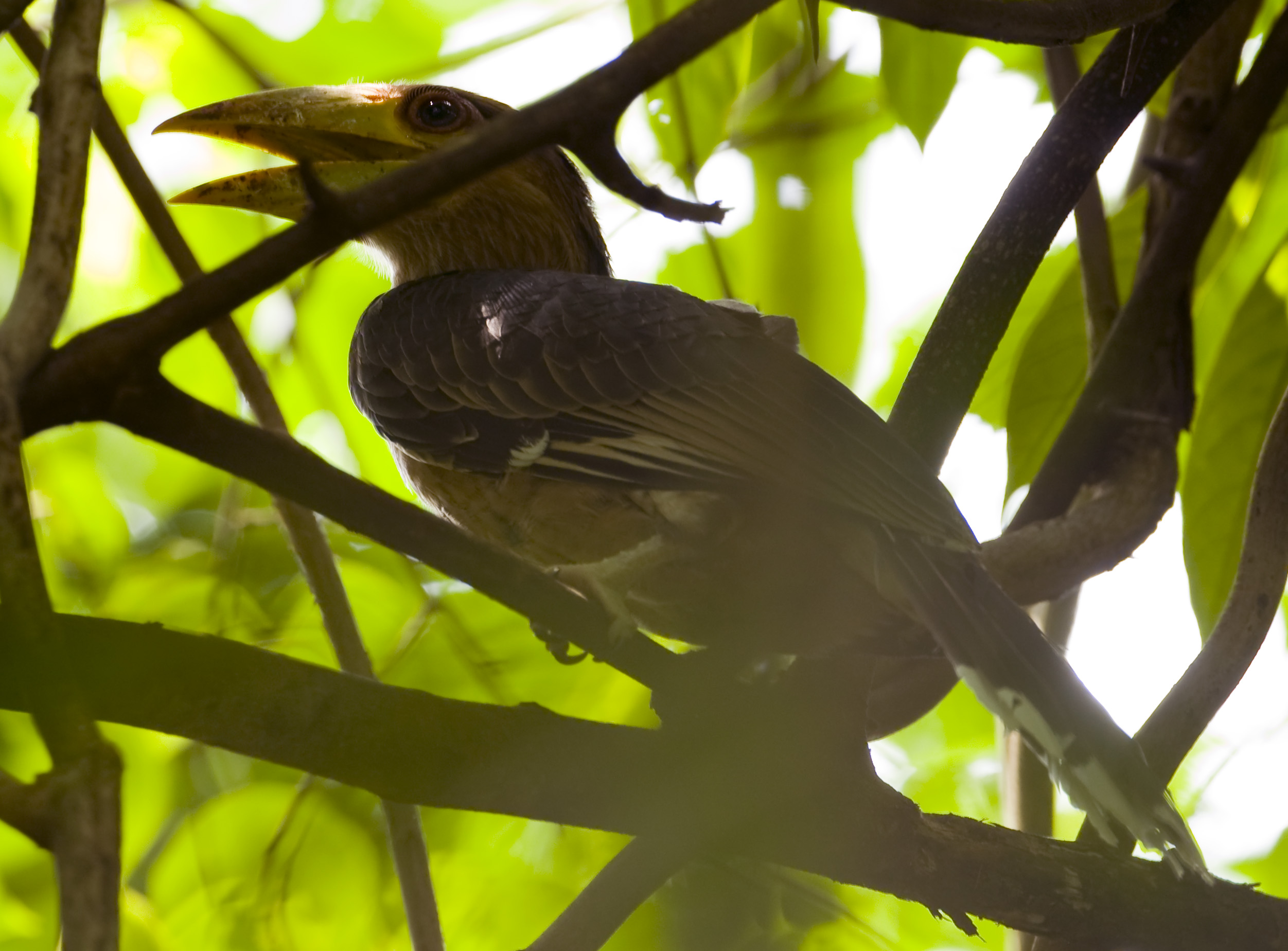
This bird fledged minutes before it was photographed
