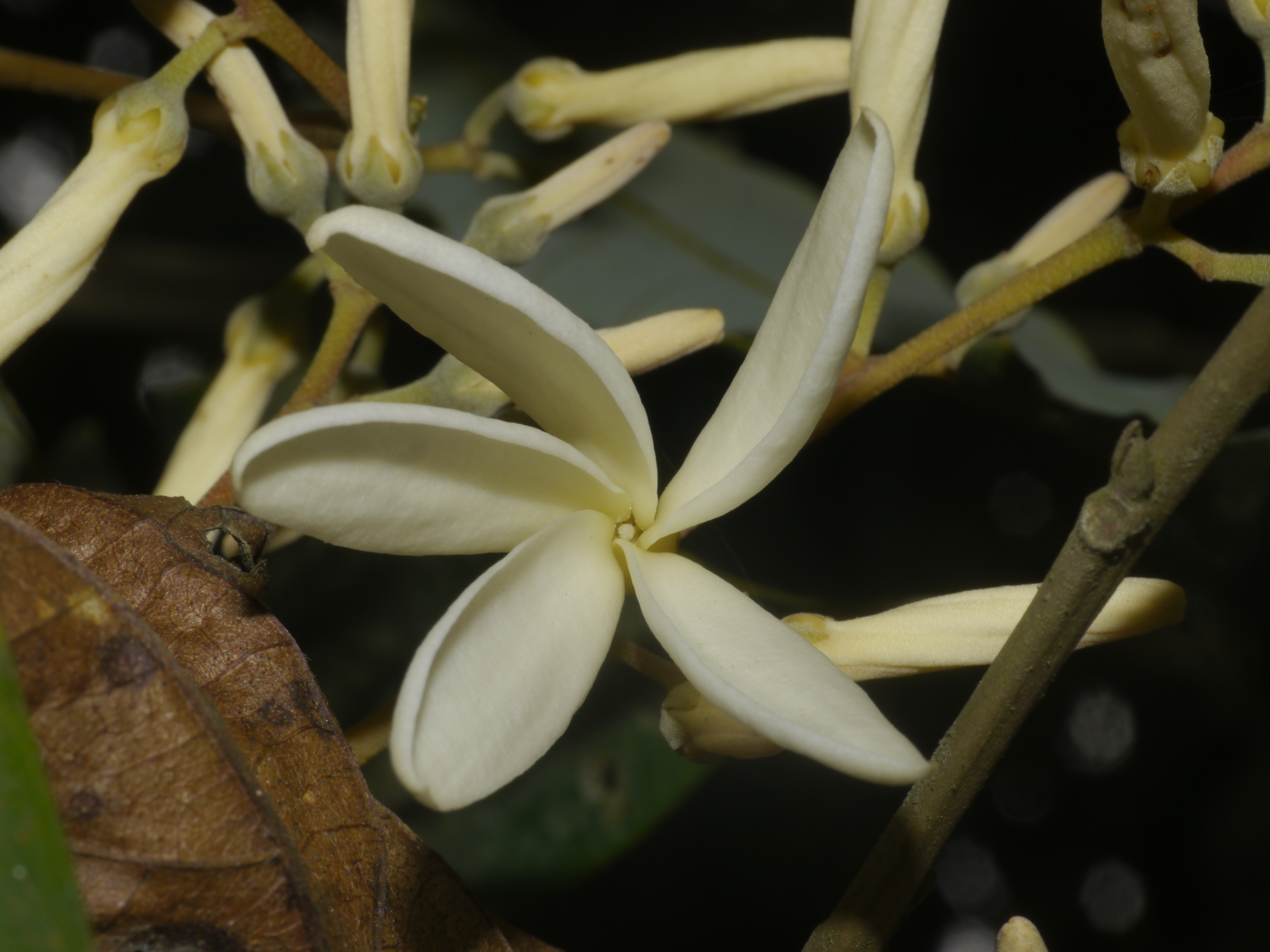

Conservation status
- Data Deficient (IUCN 3.1)

Scientific classification
- Kingdom: Plantae
- Clade: Embryophytes
- Clade: Tracheophytes
- Clade: Angiosperms
- Clade: Eudicots
- Clade: Rosids
- Order: Malvales
- Family: Dipterocarpaceae
- Genus: Vatica
- Species: V. lanceifolia

Binomial name
- Vatica lanceifolia (Roxb.) Blume

Synonyms
- Seidlia lanceifolia (Roxb.) Kostel.; Retinodendron lanceifolium Korth.; Vateria lanceifolia Roxb.; Vateria lanceolaria Roxb.; Vateria lanceolata Wight & Arn.; Vatica canaca Buch.-Ham. ex Wall.; Vatica lanceolata (Wight & Arn.) A.DC.

= Vatica lanceifolia =

Species of tree

Vatica lanceifolia, formerly Vatica lanceaefolia, is a species of plant in the family Dipterocarpaceae. It is native to Bangladesh, northeastern India, northwestern Myanmar, and southeastern Tibet. It is a data deficient species threatened by habitat loss.
