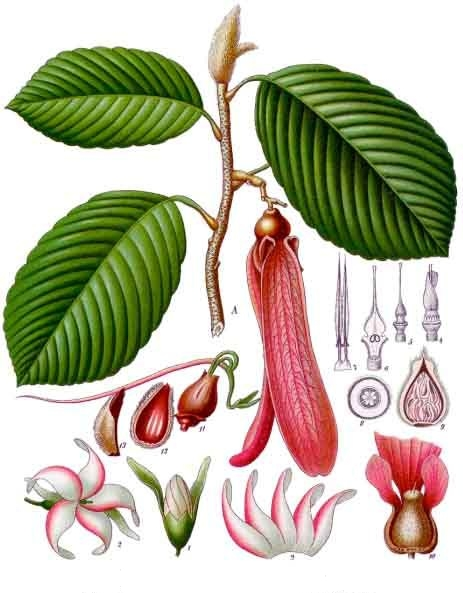
- from Koehler's Medicinal-Plants (1887)

Conservation status
- Endangered (IUCN 3.1)

Scientific classification
- Kingdom: Plantae
- Clade: Tracheophytes
- Clade: Angiosperms
- Clade: Eudicots
- Clade: Rosids
- Order: Malvales
- Family: Dipterocarpaceae
- Genus: Dipterocarpus
- Species: D. retusus

Binomial name
- Dipterocarpus retusus Blume

Synonyms
- Dipterocarpus austroyunnanicus Y.K.Yang & J.K.Wu; Dipterocarpus luchunensis Y.K.Yang & J.K.Wu; Dipterocarpus macrocarpus Vesque; Dipterocarpus mannii King ex Kanjal, P.C.Kanjal & D.Das; Dipterocarpus pubescens Koord. & Valeton; Dipterocarpus retusus var. macrocarpus (Vesque) P.S.Ashton; Dipterocarpus retusus subsp. macrocarpus (Vesque) Y.K.Yang & J.K.Wu; Dipterocarpus retusus subsp. tonkinensis (A.Chev.) Y.K.Yang & J.K.Wu; Dipterocarpus retusus var. yingjiangensis Y.K.Yang & J.K.Wu; Dipterocarpus spanoghei Blume; Dipterocarpus spanoghei var. cordata Burck; Dipterocarpus tonkinensis A.Chev.; Dipterocarpus trinervis Blume; Dipterocarpus trinervis var. canescens Blume; Dipterocarpus trinervis var. elegans Blume

= Dipterocarpus retusus =

Species of tree

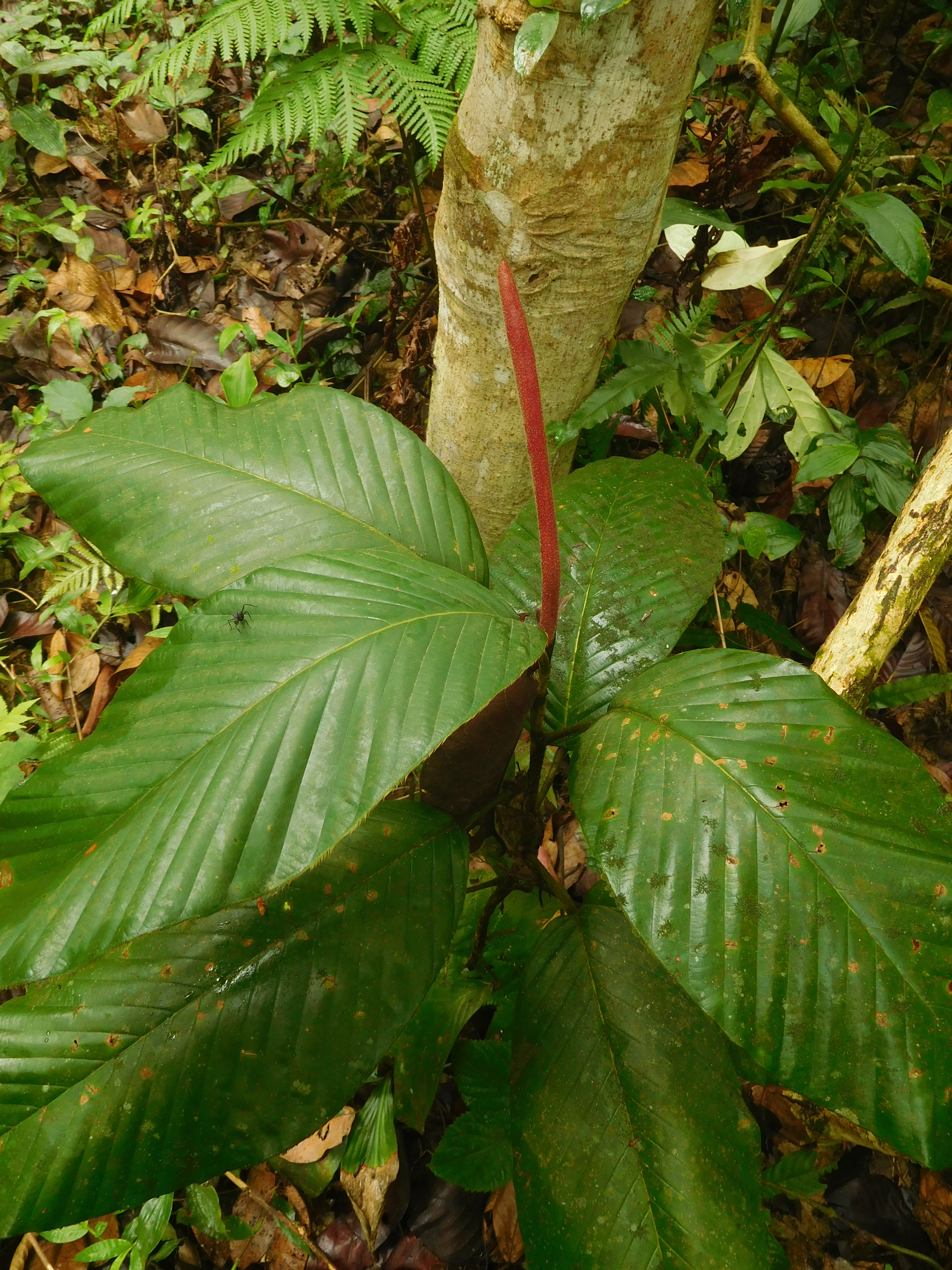
Sapling at Hoollongapar Gibbon Sanctuary, Assam

Dipterocarpus retusus, commonly known as hollong, is a large tree and perhaps the best known species in the genus Dipterocarpus. It is native to south-central China (western and southeastern Yunnan), Vietnam, the Philippines, Laos, Cambodia, Peninsular Malaysia, Indonesia (Sumatra, Java, and the Lesser Sunda Islands), Myanmar, and northeastern India. The tree, some 20–30 metres (70–100 ft) tall, is found in Cambodia in dense forests of the plains, common on hillsides and along rivers and in forests between 800 m (2,600 ft) and 1,500 m (5,000 ft) elevation.

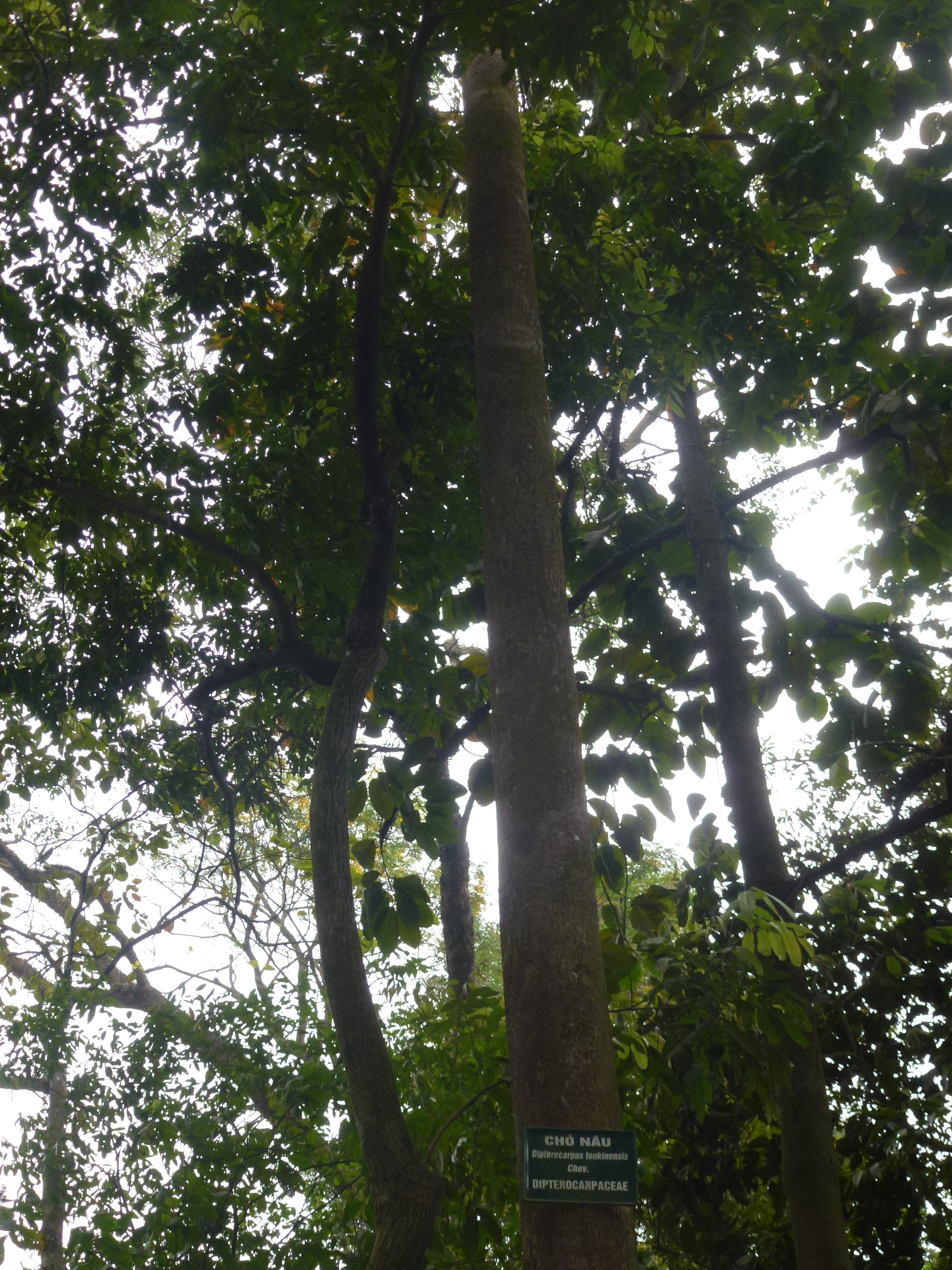
In Vietnam

Hollong is the state tree of Assam and Arunachal Pradesh, India. In India, the timber is used for plywood and making various containers. In China, the timber is used in construction. Hollong is a sacred tree for Moran community of Assam.

== Uses ==
It is farmed for its timber and resin. In Cambodia, the resin is collected by people in the mountainous regions, in order to make torches and candles, while the wood is used in construction to make columns and boards.
