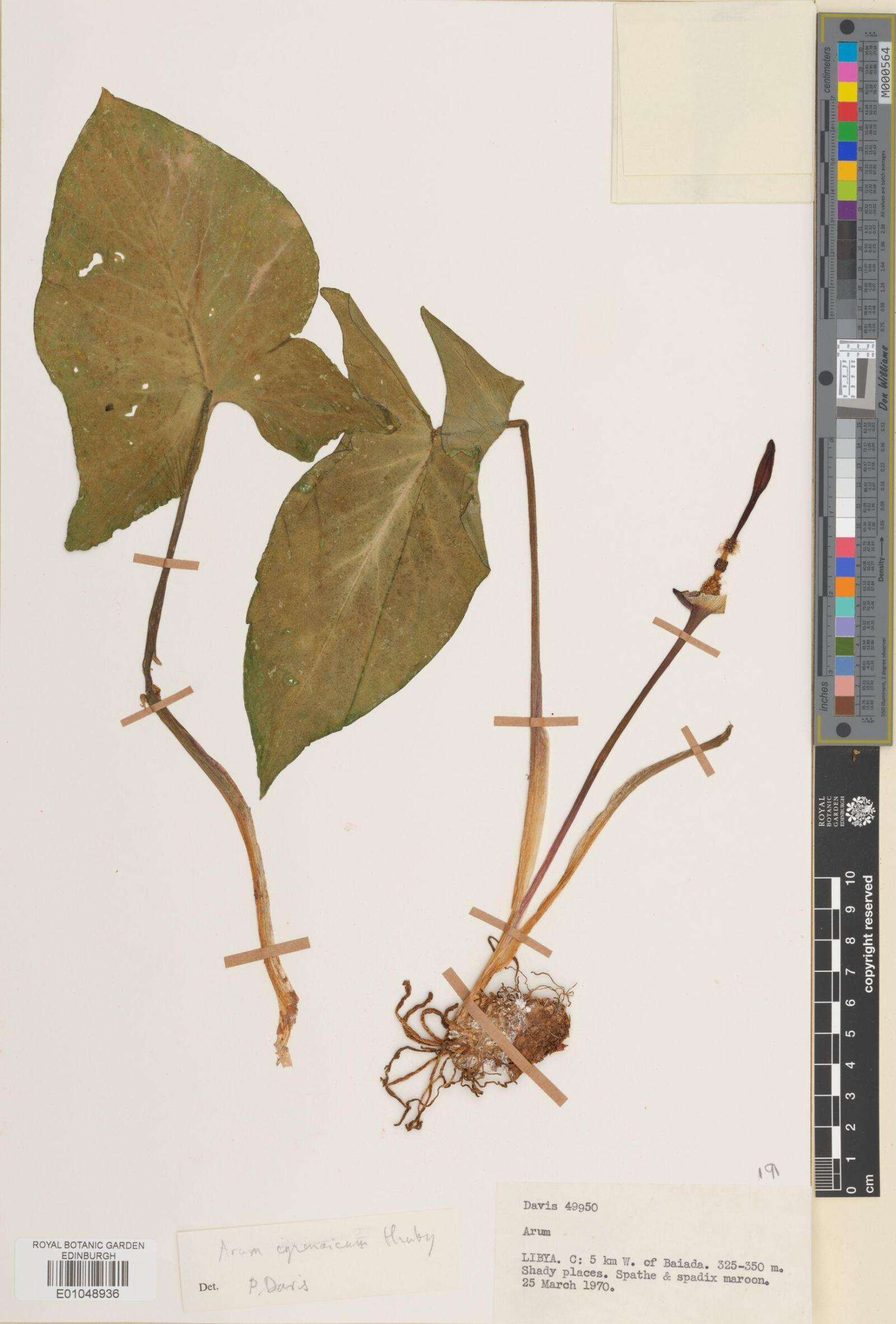

Scientific classification
- Kingdom: Plantae
- Clade: Tracheophytes
- Clade: Angiosperms
- Clade: Monocots
- Order: Alismatales
- Family: Araceae
- Genus: Arum
- Species: A. cyrenaicum

Binomial name
- Arum cyrenaicum Hruby (1912)
- Range of A. cyrenaicum (precise locations only)

= Arum cyrenaicum =

Species of plant

Arum cyrenaicum is a woodland plant species of the family Araceae. It has a disjunct distribution, being found in Greece and in Libya, where it has seen limited use as a foraged root and leaf vegetable.

== Description ==
It has discoid tubers with dimensions 3–5 centimetres (1.2–2.0 in) × 1–3 centimetres (0.39–1.18 in).

Petioles are dark green and 6–30 centimetres (2.4–11.8 in) long. Leaves usually number 4; individual simple, with hastate or sagittate blade morphology and a sharp apex 7–22 centimetres (2.8–8.7 in) × 5–13 centimetres (2.0–5.1 in). The central vein is clear, and veins are reticulate-pinnate.

Inflorescence bisexual and monoecious. Spathe up to 26 centimetres (10 in) long, coiled at the bottom, widening at the middle and sharp at the top; laminate, lanceolate, acuminate, purple. Spathe one third shorter than spadix. Spadix 6–12 centimetres (2.4–4.7 in) long but indistinctly shaped, dung-scented. Spadix dark purple at the edges, pale green at the middle. The female flowers are below the male flowers on the lower part of the spadix, with 4–8 millimetres (0.16–0.31 in) between them. Club elongate, conical, obtuse, almost prostrately thickened from the stem, or more-or-less cylindrical like the purple stem, the same length as the stem, often longer. Male flowers form 4–5 purple circular rows; stamen filaments short, with pale purple anther and flexible yellow to cream coloured staminodes. Female flowers form 6–7 yellow circular rows; ovary single-chambered, usually with 4 ovules, no style, hemispherical stigma, parietal placentation topped with creamy yellow pistillodes. Upper organs polycyclic, neutral, yellowish, lower oligocyclic or completely absent as in A. pictum.

Fruits are green berries, which transition to orange and mature to red.

Morphological descriptions have also been published in 1977 and by Ralf and Schönfelder in 1995.

== Taxonomy ==
It was first collected at the entrance of Lethe cave (Benghazi) by Gustav Ferdinand Ruhmer in 1883 but under the name A. italicum var. byzantinum Schott. This specimen has been lost. The next collection was by Paul Hermann Wilhelm Taubert in 1887, again in Cyrenaica, but under the name Arum nickelii Schott.

== Distribution and habitat ==
Restricted to Crete and Cyrenaica. On Crete, it has been found near Vlthias, among other places. In Cyrenaica, it has been found at the entrance of Lethe cave, in the Wadi Zaza, the Wadi Belkaf, and at Cyrene, among other places.

The species was originally thought to be a Cyrenian endemic. But on 9 April 1984, Mary Briggs observed and photographed an individual near Vlithias (Palaiochora), and returned in March 1988 to send living material to Peter Boyce, who grew several individuals from Cretan stock and confirmed their identity as A. cyrenaicum.

On Crete, A. cyrenaicum grows in a woodland of Platanus orientalis L., associated with Arum concinnatum Schott, Cyclamen creticum Hildebr., Hedera helix L., and Tamus communis L..

At Cyrene, A. cyrenaicum is the dominant species in one community at an elevation of 555 metres (1,821 ft). The other Araceae members are found in Cyrene are Arisarum vulgare and Biarum bovei, though the former and A. cyrenaicum are much more common than the latter.

== Ecology ==
A. cyrenaicum is an annual herbaceous species. It is an understory species, growing to 40 centimetres (16 in), flowering March-April. It can be pollinated by Nematocera species, attracted by its dung-like scent.

== Uses ==
The rhizomes are used as food in Libya. It is said to have been consumed by Senussi rebels against the Italians.

It has also been noted as a potential ornamental plant.

Its anticancer and antidiabetic potential has been investigated. For anticancer activity, it was determined the fruit extract has shown toxicity on normal cells, while the root extract showed weak activity on cancer cells. For antidiabetic activity, PTP inhibition has been shown for the root and aerial part extracts.

=== Toxicity ===
A 2012 study confirmed the presence of oxalate type raphides in the species, especially concentrated in the leaves and fruit. With the exception of the corms, cyanogenic glycosides were also found throughout the plant, but especially in the inflorescences and fruits, then the spathes, and to a lesser extent the leaves. They determined these glycosides were destroyed with thermal treatment. They performed an acute toxicity test on laboratory mice, in which a dose of 2000 mg/kg of heated extract resulted in no metabolic or behavioral changes, confirming the ability of heat to destroy the raphides.

=== Chemistry ===
The seeds' major hydrocarbons are nonacosane (also present in the roots), hexadecane and 9,12-octadecadiene, which occur alongside nonacosanol. The fatty acid methyl ester myrestic acid predominates in the seeds, but is secondary to margaric acid in the roots.

The most abundant volatile compounds emitted by the inflorescence is bicyclogermacrene, followed by 1-decene, β-citronellene, dimethyl-octadiene, p-cresol and an unidentified sesquiterpene, and with lower abundances of methyl butyrate, methyl isobutyrate, 2-heptanone and 2-nonanone, and trace amounts of 2-methyl methyl butyrate, methyl benzoate, indole, skatole and various sesquiterpenes.

== Bibliography ==
- GBIF (2025-05-12). "Arum cyrenaicum Hruby Occurrence Download". Global Biodiversity Information Facility. doi:10.15468/dl.ek3cat.
- Łuczaj, Łukasz; Emre, Gizem (2025-02-13). "Lords-and-Ladies (Arum) as Food in Eurasia: A Review". Plants. 14 (4): 577. Bibcode:2025Plnts..14..577L. doi:10.3390/plants14040577. eISSN 2223-7747. PMC 11859539. PMID 40006836.
- El-Mokasabi, Farag; Omar, Naser; El-Garary, Ebtesam (2025-02-05). "Libyan Collections in Foreign Herbaria". AlQalam Journal of Medical and Applied Sciences. 8 (1): 221–229. doi:10.54361/ajmas.258134. eISSN 2707-7179.
- Dakeel, Ensaf H.; Hamad, Hamida M.; Ali, Rania; Saed, Enas (2024). "Vegetation Analysis of Cyrene Campus apollo Shahat AL-Jabal AL-Akhdar, Libya". المجلة الليبية لعلوم وتكنولوجيا البيئة. 6 (1): 62–72. doi:10.63359/v7zbv344. eISSN 2710-5237.
- Hamad, Hamida M.; Dakeel, Ensaf H.; Alwishish, Fatma M.; Saed, Inas (2024-04-17). "Survey of plant species in Cyrene (campus apollo) Shahat AL-Jabal AL-Akhdar, Libya". Scientific Journal for Faculty of Science-Sirte University. 4 (1): 36–44. doi:10.37375/sjfssu.v4i1.2637 (inactive 1 July 2025). eISSN 2789-858X.
- Zargoun, Aziza H.; Mohammed, Abdelhafeez M. A.; Abdelshafeek, Khaled A.; Ibansharrada, Abdalla A.; Alomari, Abdulaziz Ali (December 2020). "GC/MS analysis of lipid constituents and antimicrobial activity of Arum cyrinaicum extracts". Egyptian Journal of Chemistry. 63 (12): 4889–4910. doi:10.21608/ejchem.2020.30199.2647. eISSN 2357-0245.
- Salih, Sami Mohammed; Abdulrraziq, Ahmed Amrajaa (2020-09-30). "الوصف المورفولوجي لنبات الرينش البرقاوي Arum cyreniacum Hruby في منطقة الجبل الأخضر - ليبيا" [Morphological Characterization of Arum cyrenaicum Hruby Plant in Al-Jabal Al-Akhdar Region-Libya]. مجلة المختار للعلوم (in Arabic). 35 (3): 246–254. doi:10.54172/mjsc.v35i3.297. eISSN 3006-6352.
- Saad, Ebtisam Salem Saleh (2019). Phytochemical, anticancer and antidiabetic studies on Libyan plants : Arum cyrenaicum, Pituranthos tortuosus, Teucrium zanonii, Hypochaeris radicata and Solanum sodomaeum (Thesis). Strathclyde: University of Strathclyde. doi:10.48730/f8kq-pd43.
- Alaib, Mohamed A.; Elbakkosh, Ali M.; Ali, Yousef B.; Gadelmola, Abdulati S.; Elmhafdi, Abdurrahman M. (2016). "Preliminary Investigation of the Vegetation of Wadi Belkaf- Bata Al-Jabal Al-Akhdar-Libya" (PDF). Libyan Journal of Basic Science. 4 (1): 20–27. eISSN 2707-6261.
- Ben Ramadan, Laila; Zwawi, A.; Almaghour, Hind G.; Saad, M.; Alfalah, A.; BenAmer, L.; Auzi, A. (2012). "Toxicity and Antioxidant of Arum Cyrenaicum Hurby". The Egyptian Journal of Forensic Sciences and Applied Toxicology. 12 (2): 31–47. doi:10.12816/0005072. eISSN 2535-1915.
- Gibernau, Marc; Macquart, David; Przetak, Gilles (2004). "Pollination in the genus Arum – a review" (PDF). Aroideana. 27: 148–166. ISSN 0197-4033. Archived from the original (PDF) on 2020-08-19.
- El-Barasi, Yacoub Mohamed; El-Sherif, I. M.; Gawhari, Ahmed (July 2003). "Checklist and analysis of the flora and vegetation of Wadi Zaza at AI-Jabal AI Akhdar (Cyrenaica, Libya)" (PDF). Bocconea. 16 (2): 1091–1105. doi:10.7320/Bocc16.2.1091 (inactive 1 July 2025). ISSN 1120-4060.
- Kite, Geoffrey C.; et al. (2000). "Inflorescence odours and pollinators of Arum and Amorphophallus (Araceae)" (PDF). Reproductive Biology in Systematics, Conservation and Economic Botany. Royal Botanic Gardens, Kew. pp. 295–315. ISBN 1900347628.
- Ralf, Jahn; Schönfelder, Peter (1995). Exkursionsflora für Kreta [Excursion Flora for Crete] (in German). Ulmer. ISBN 3-8001-3478-0.
- Turland, Nicholas J. (1992-11-26). "Studies on the Cretan flora 1. Floristic notes". Bulletin of the British Museum (Natural History). 22 (2): 159–164. ISSN 0068-2306.
- Boyce, Peter C. (1987). "A new species of Arum L. from Crete". Aroideana. 10 (1): 6–8. ISSN 0197-4033.
- Jafri, S. M. H.; El-Gadi, A., eds. (1977). Flora of Libya. Vol. 41: Araceae.
- Hruby, Johann (1912). "Le genre Arum: Aperçu systématique avec considérations spéciales sur les relations phylogénétiques des formes" [The Genus Arum: A Systematic Overview with Special Considerations on the Phylogenetic Relations of its Forms]. Bulletin de la Société botanique de Genève II (in French) (4). Geneva: 113–160. ISSN 0366-3108.
