= Cuckoo pint =

Cuckoo pint refers to more than one species of the genus Arum:

- Arum italicum ("Italian lords-and-ladies"), ssp. neglectum a.k.a. late cuckoo pint
- Arum maculatum, lords-and-ladies, a.k.a. cuckoo pint, Adam and Eve, and other vernacular names
