= Lords and Ladies =

Lords and Ladies are members of the peerage. The term may also refer to:

== Entertainment ==
- Lords and Ladies (novel), a Discworld novel by Terry Pratchett

== Flora and fauna ==
- Arum italicum, known as Italian lords-and-ladies, a flowering plant native to the British Isles and much of the Mediterranean region, the Caucasus, Canary Islands, Madeira and northern Africa
- Arum maculatum, known as lords-and-ladies, a flowering plant native to most of Europe, Eastern Turkey and the Caucasus
- Harlequin duck, known as lords and ladies in North America, a small sea bird
