= Arum italicum subsp. albispathum =

Scientific classification
- Kingdom: Plantae
- Clade: Tracheophytes
- Clade: Angiosperms
- Clade: Monocots
- Order: Alismatales
- Family: Araceae
- Genus: Arum
- Species: A. italicum
- Subspecies: A. i. subsp. albispathum

Trinomial name
- Arum italicum subsp. albispathum (Steven ex Ledeb.) Prime

Synonyms
- Arum albispathum Steven ex Ledeb.; Arum orientale var. albispathum (Steven ex Ledeb.) Engler in A. & C. DC.; Arum orientale subsp. albispathum (Steven ex Ledeb.) Nyman; Arum orientale subsp. albispathum (Steven ex Ledeb.) Richter

Subspecies of plant

Arum italicum subsp. albispathum is a flowering plant subspecies in the family Araceae.

== Description ==
Arum italicum subsp. albispathum differs from other subspecies in having very pale, nearly white spathes and pale yellow spathe appendices. This subspecies is reported to have a lower chromosome number, with tetraploid counts in subsp. albispathum (2n = 56) and hexaploid counts in subsp. italicum and subsp. neglectum (2n = 84).

== Habitat ==
It grows in woodlands from the Caucasus west to Crimea.

== Taxonomy ==
Within the genus Arum, it belongs to subgenus Arum, and section Arum. Though currently considered a subspecies of Arum italicum, its relationship with the other subspecies of A. italicum and with Arum concinnatum are unclear and it may represent an independent species.
