= Arum italicum subsp. canariense =

Scientific classification
- Kingdom: Plantae
- Clade: Tracheophytes
- Clade: Angiosperms
- Clade: Monocots
- Order: Alismatales
- Family: Araceae
- Genus: Arum
- Species: A. italicum
- Subspecies: A. i. subsp. canariense

Trinomial name
- Arum italicum subsp. canariense (Webb & Berthel.) P.C.Boyce

Synonyms
- Arum canariense (Webb. & Berth.) Boyce; Arum italicum var. canariense (Webb. & Berth.) Engler in A. & C. DC.

Subspecies of plant

Arum italicum subsp. canariense is a flowering plant subspecies in the family Araceae.

== Description ==
Arum italicum subsp. canariense differs from other subspecies in having spathe tubes that are purple on the interior, staminodes in 2 or 3 whorls (versus 4 or 5 in other subspecies), and petioles and peduncles that are dull purple instead of green. Leaves and inflorescences of Madeiran plants are also reportedly larger than continental plants.

== Habitat ==
It grows in clearings in Laurus forests in Madeira, the Canary Islands, and the Azores.

== Taxonomy ==
It was described in 1848 as an independent species, Arum canariense. Within the genus Arum, it belongs to subgenus Arum, and section Arum. A recent molecular study found that this island subspecies is well-differentiated from its mainland relatives, although its specific status and relationship with the mainland Arum italicum and with Arum concinnatum are unclear.
