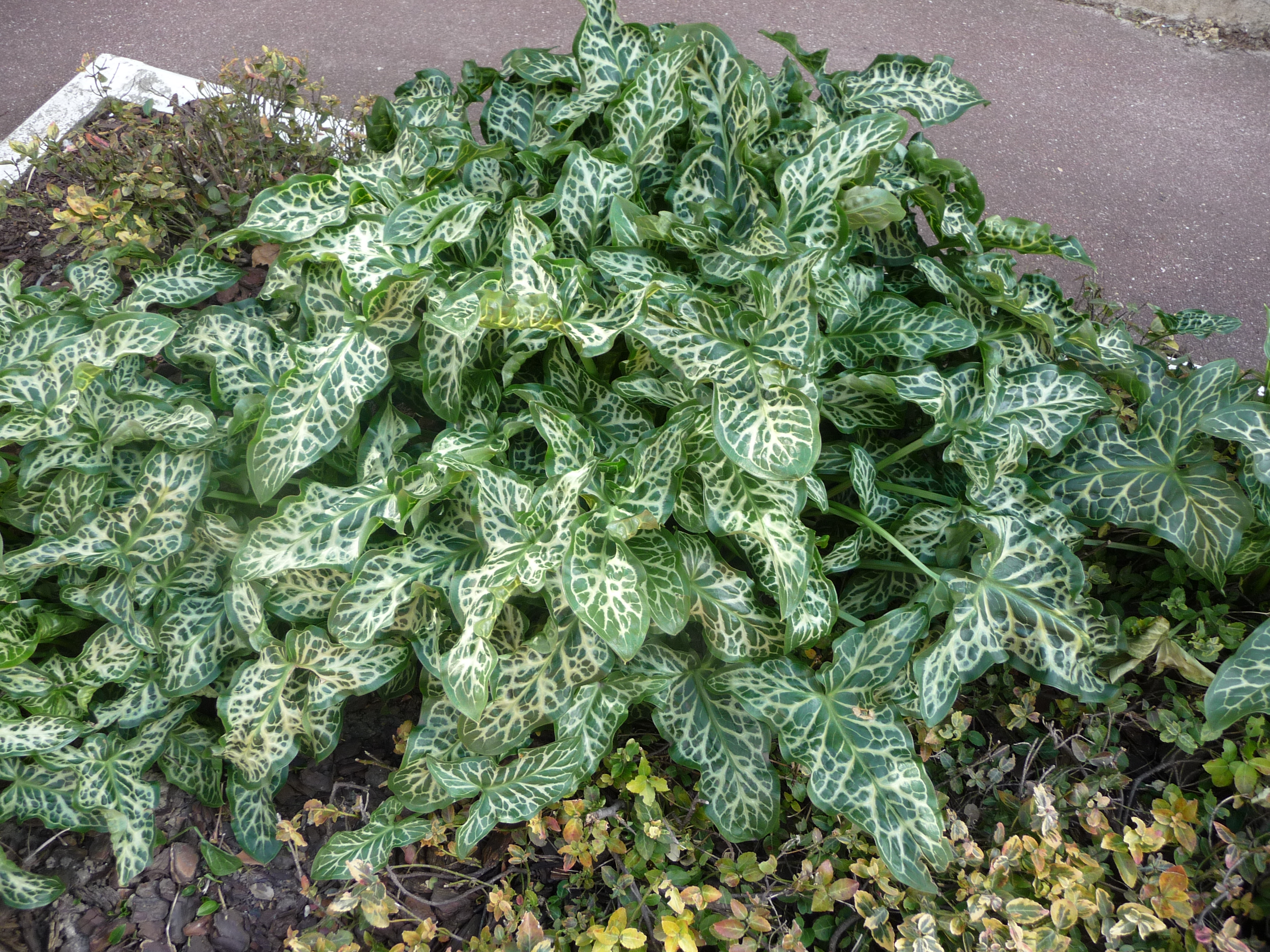

Scientific classification
- Kingdom: Plantae
- Clade: Tracheophytes
- Clade: Angiosperms
- Clade: Monocots
- Order: Alismatales
- Family: Araceae
- Genus: Arum
- Species: A. italicum Mill.
- Subspecies: A. i. subsp. italicum

Trinomial name
- Arum italicum subsp. italicum

= Arum italicum subsp. italicum =

Subspecies of plant

Arum italicum subsp. italicum is a flowering plant subspecies in the family Araceae.

== Description ==
Arum italicum subsp. italicum is a morphologically variable subspecies. Leaves often have various degrees of pale veining or blotching, although uniform green leaves also occur. Spathe limbs are greenish to yellowish white, while the spathe tube is greenish white on the inside (sometimes stained with purple). Spadix appendices are dark yellow.

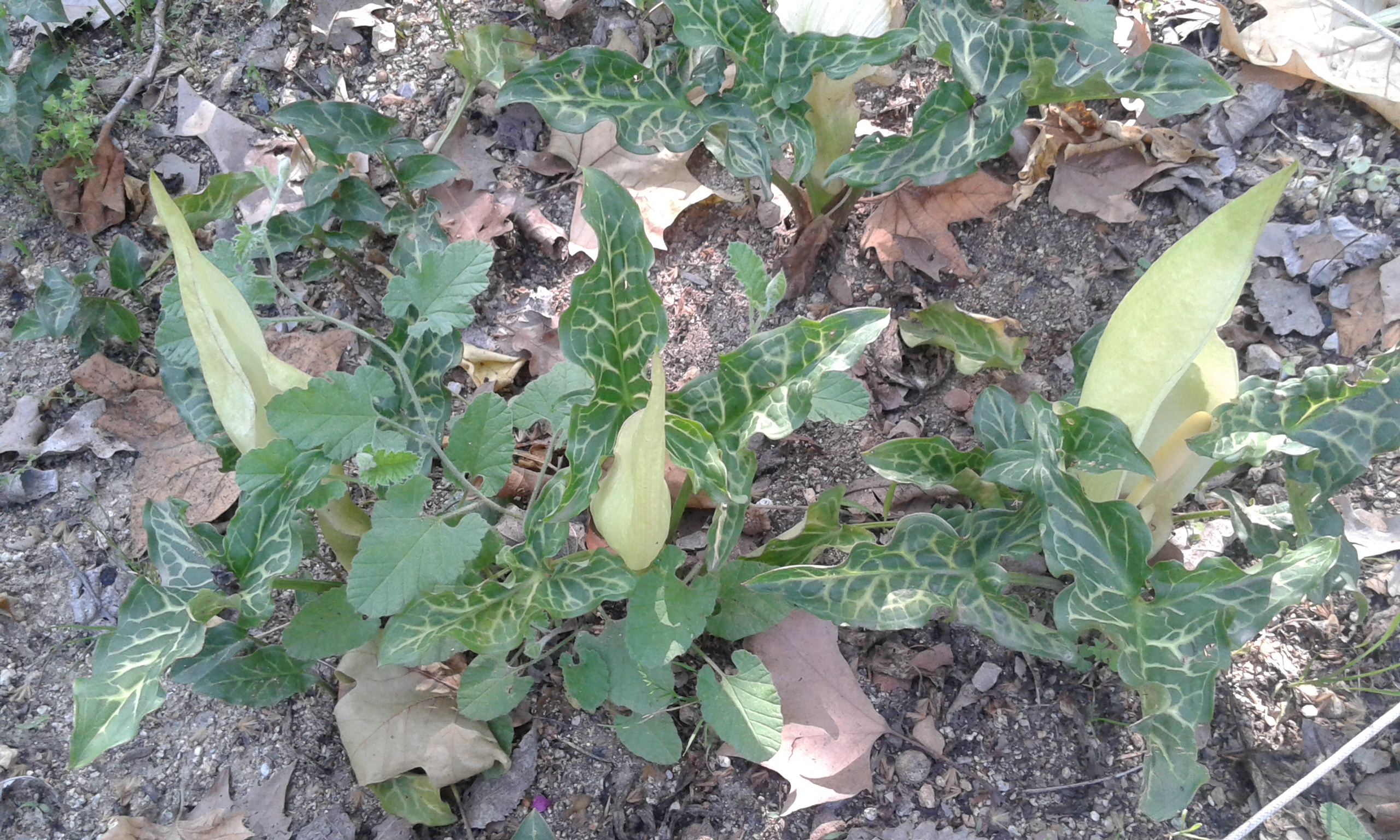
Flowering plants of Arum italicum subsp. italicum.

Plants from the British Isles and the Atlantic coast of western Europe with deep green leaves and winter leaves differing in shape from spring leaves have been treated as a distinct subspecies, Arum italicum subsp. neglectum (F. Towns.) Prime. Differences in germination (epigeal in subsp. italicum, hypogeal in subsp. neglectum) and phenology (subsp. italicum beginning growth earlier) have also been reported. However, there are intermediate forms between the two subspecies, particularly on the European mainland, and there have been proposals to merge the two under subsp. italicum.

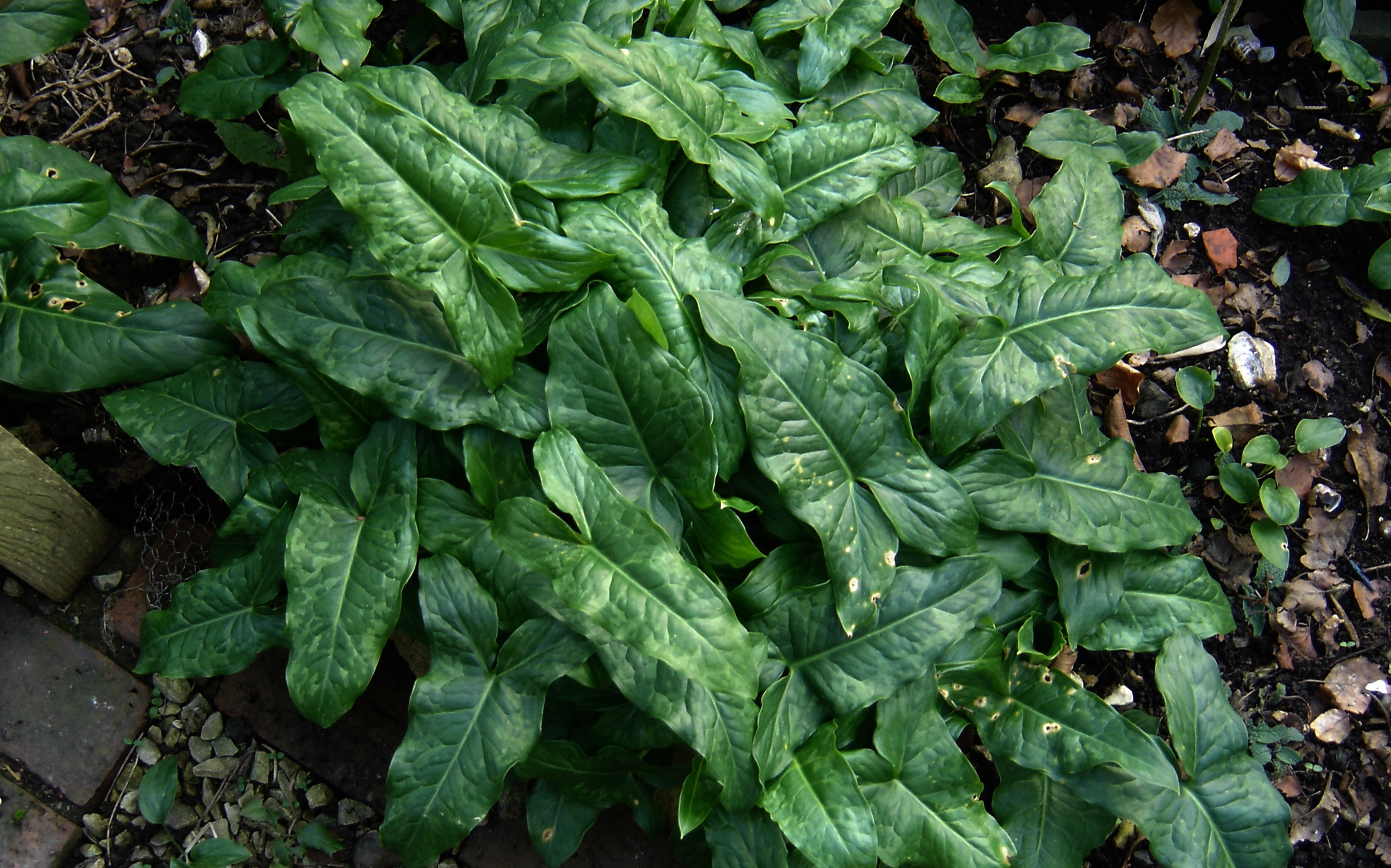
Arum italicum subsp. neglectum, traditionally recognized as a distinct subspecies.

== Habitat ==
It in a wide range of habitats between sea level and 1,200 meters. It is native to Europe south of the Netherlands, North Africa, and north and western Turkey, but has is now widely established elsewhere after being introduced as an ornamental plant

== Taxonomy ==
Within the genus Arum, it belongs to subgenus Arum, and section Arum. Its relationship with the other subspecies of A. italicum and with Arum concinnatum are unclear.

This subspecies is reportedly hexaploid (2n = 84).
