= 1-Nonacosanol =

29-carbon primary fatty alcohol

Names
- Preferred IUPAC name Nonacosan-1-ol
- Other names Nonacosanol

Identifiers
CAS Number	6624-76-6
3D model (JSmol)	Interactive image
ChemSpider	213080
PubChem CID	243696
UNII	KE2MXY103L
CompTox Dashboard (EPA)	DTXSID40216446
- InChI: InChI=1S/C29H60O/c1-2-3-4-5-6-7-8-9-10-11-12-13-14-15-16-17-18-19-20-21-22-23-24-25-26-27-28-29-30/h30H,2-29H2,1H3 Key: PKBSGDQYUYBUDY-UHFFFAOYSA-N; InChI=1/C29H60O/c1-2-3-4-5-6-7-8-9-10-11-12-13-14-15-16-17-18-19-20-21-22-23-24-25-26-27-28-29-30/h30H,2-29H2,1H3 Key: PKBSGDQYUYBUDY-UHFFFAOYAQ
- SMILES: OCCCCCCCCCCCCCCCCCCCCCCCCCCCCC

Properties
Chemical formula	C_{29}H_{60}O
Molar mass	424.798 g·mol^{−1}
- Except where otherwise noted, data are given for materials in their standard state (at 25 °C [77 °F], 100 kPa). verify (what is ?) Infobox references

1-Nonacosanol is a straight-chain aliphatic 29-carbon primary fatty alcohol. It is found in a variety of plants including sisal (Agave sisalana).
