= Methyl isobutyrate =

Names
- Preferred IUPAC name Methyl 2-methylpropanoate

Identifiers
CAS Number	547-63-7
3D model (JSmol)	Interactive image
ChemSpider	10571
ECHA InfoCard	100.008.118
EC Number	208-929-5
PubChem CID	11039
UNII	EM286QL922
CompTox Dashboard (EPA)	DTXSID5060275
- InChI: InChI=1S/C5H10O2/c1-4(2)5(6)7-3/h4H,1-3H3 Key: BHIWKHZACMWKOJ-UHFFFAOYSA-N
- SMILES: CC(C)C(=O)OC

Properties
Chemical formula	C_{5}H_{10}O_{2}
Molar mass	102.133 g·mol^{−1}
Appearance	Colorless liquid
Density	0.895 g/cm^{3}
Melting point	−85 °C (−121 °F; 188 K)
Boiling point	99–100 °C (210–212 °F; 372–373 K)
- Except where otherwise noted, data are given for materials in their standard state (at 25 °C [77 °F], 100 kPa). Infobox references

Methyl isobutyrate is an organic compound with the formula CH_{3}O_{2}CCH(CH_{3})_{2}. This colorless liquid, the methyl ester of isobutyric acid, is used as a solvent.
