= Arum byzantinum =

Scientific classification
- Kingdom: Plantae
- Clade: Embryophytes
- Clade: Tracheophytes
- Clade: Angiosperms
- Clade: Monocots
- Order: Alismatales
- Family: Araceae
- Genus: Arum
- Species: A. byzantinum

Binomial name
- Arum byzantinum Blume

Synonyms
- Arum italicum var. byzantinum (Blume) Engler; Arum italicum subsp. byzantinum (Blume) Nyman; Arum italicum subsp. byzantinum (Blume) Richter

Species of flowering plant

Arum byzantinum is a species of flowering plant in the family Araceae. It was described in 1836.

== Description ==
Arum byzantinum is a small tuberous herb that spreads clonally through horizontal rhizomatous tubers. Flowering takes place from late May to early June; flowers are borne on a spadix that produces an unpleasant smell. Spadices are 4.5–10 centimetres (1.8–3.9 in) long and have club-shaped, purple appendices.

== Habitat ==
The species is endemic to northwest Turkey, where it grows in deciduous woodland, hedgerows, and damp areas.

== Taxonomy ==
Within the genus Arum, it belongs to subgenus Arum, section Arum. A. byzantinum is diploid, with a chromosome count of 2n = 28.

The species should not be confused with Arum byzantinum Schott, a junior synonym of Arum concinnatum Schott. Although often sold as A. byzantinum in the horticultural trade, A concinnatum is a more widespread, larger hexaploid species with large, yellow spadices.

== Bibliography ==
- Hruby, Johann (1912). "Le genre Arum: Aperçu systématique avec considérations spéciales sur les relations phylogénétiques des formes" [The Genus Arum: A Systematic Overview with Special Considerations on the Phylogenetic Relations of its Forms]. Bulletin de la Société botanique de Genève II (in French) (4). Geneva: 113–160. ISSN 0366-3108.
