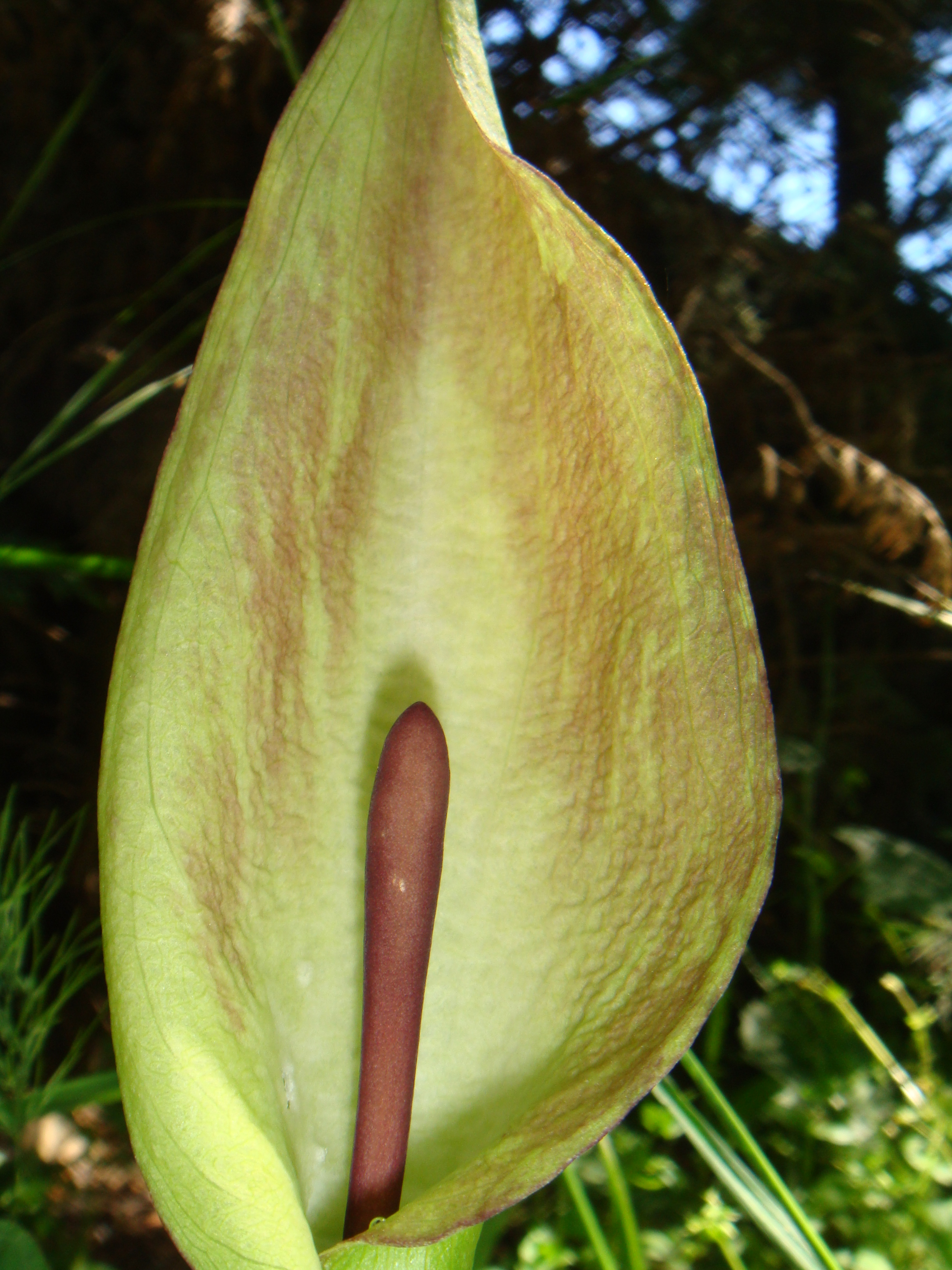

Scientific classification
- Kingdom: Plantae
- Clade: Tracheophytes
- Clade: Angiosperms
- Clade: Monocots
- Order: Alismatales
- Family: Araceae
- Genus: Arum
- Species: A. maculatum

Binomial name
- Arum maculatum L.

Synonyms
- Arum vernale Salisb.; Arisarum maculatum (L.) Raf.; Arum vulgare Lam.; Arum pyrenaeum Dufour; Arum immaculatum (Rchb.) Rchb.; Arum malyi Schott; Arum zeleborii Schott; Arum trapezuntinum Schott ex Engl.; Arum heldreichii Orph. ex Boiss.

= Arum maculatum =

Species of flowering plant

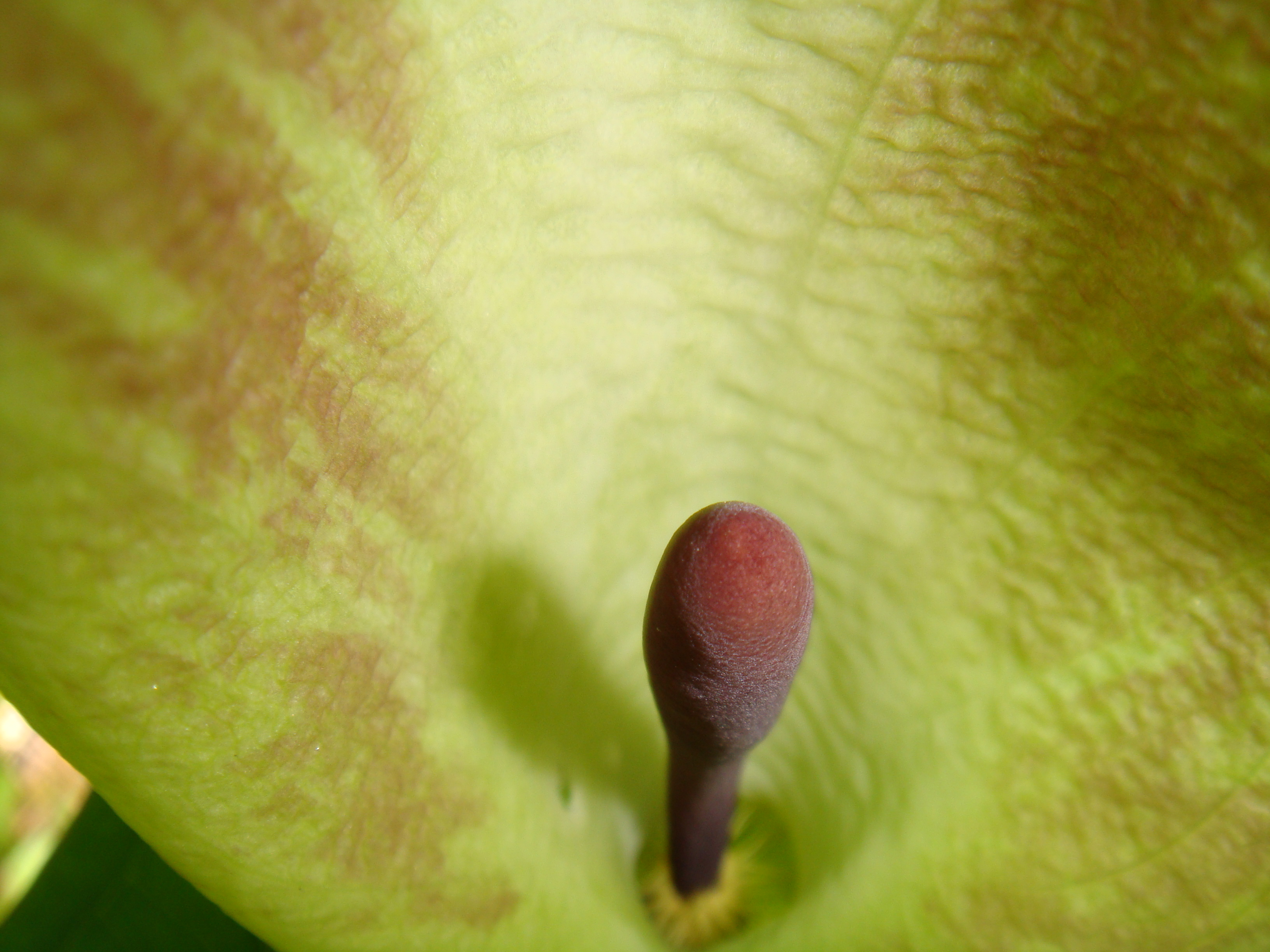
Spathe and Spadix close-up

Arum maculatum, commonly known as cuckoopint, jack-in-the-pulpit and other names (see common names), is a woodland flowering plant species in the family Araceae. It is native across most of Europe, as well as Eastern Turkey and the Caucasus.

== Description ==
The leaves of A. maculatum appear in the spring (April–May in the northern hemisphere, October–November in the southern hemisphere) and are 7 to 20 cm long. They are triangular with a very obvious arrow-head shape at the base. Unusually for monocots, the leaves have a long stalk and the veins are a network (not the more typical linear veins). There may be purple patches on the dark green leaves. These are followed by the flowers borne on a poker-shaped inflorescence called a spadix, which is partially enclosed in a pale green spathe or leaf-like hood. By relative inflorescence height, Arum species are divided into "cryptic" species, whose inflorescences are borne on a short peduncle amid or below the leaves, and "flag" species, whose inflorescences are above leaf level at the end of long peduncles. A. maculatum is a cryptic species. The spathe can be up to 25 cm high and the fruiting spike which follows later in the season may be up to 5 cm. The flowers are hidden from sight, clustered at the base of the spadix with a ring of female flowers at the bottom and a ring of male flowers above them. The leaves may be either purple-spotted (var. maculatum) or unspotted (var. immaculatum).

Above the male flowers is a ring of hairs forming an insect trap. Insects, especially owl-midges Psychoda phalaenoides, are attracted to the spadix by its faecal odour and a temperature up to 15 °C warmer than the ambient temperature. The insects are trapped beneath the ring of hairs and are dusted with pollen by the male flowers before escaping and carrying the pollen to the spadices of other plants, where they pollinate the female flowers. The spadix may also be yellow, but purple is the more common.

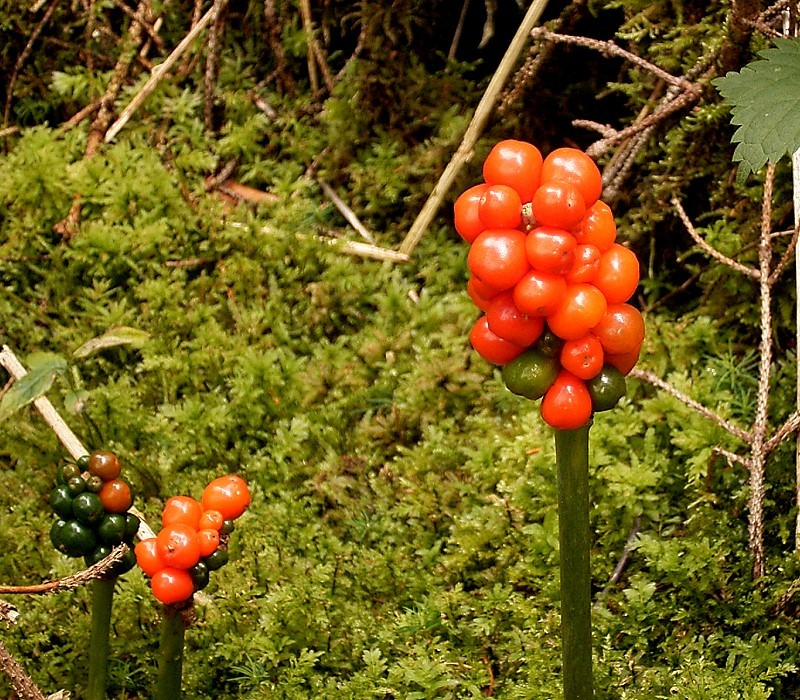
Poisonous berries

In autumn, the lower ring of (female) flowers forms a cluster of bright red, berries up to 5 cm long which remain after the spathe and other leaves have withered away. These attractive red to orange berries are extremely poisonous.

The root-tuber may be very big and is used to store starch. In mature specimens, the tuber may be as much as 400 mm below ground level.

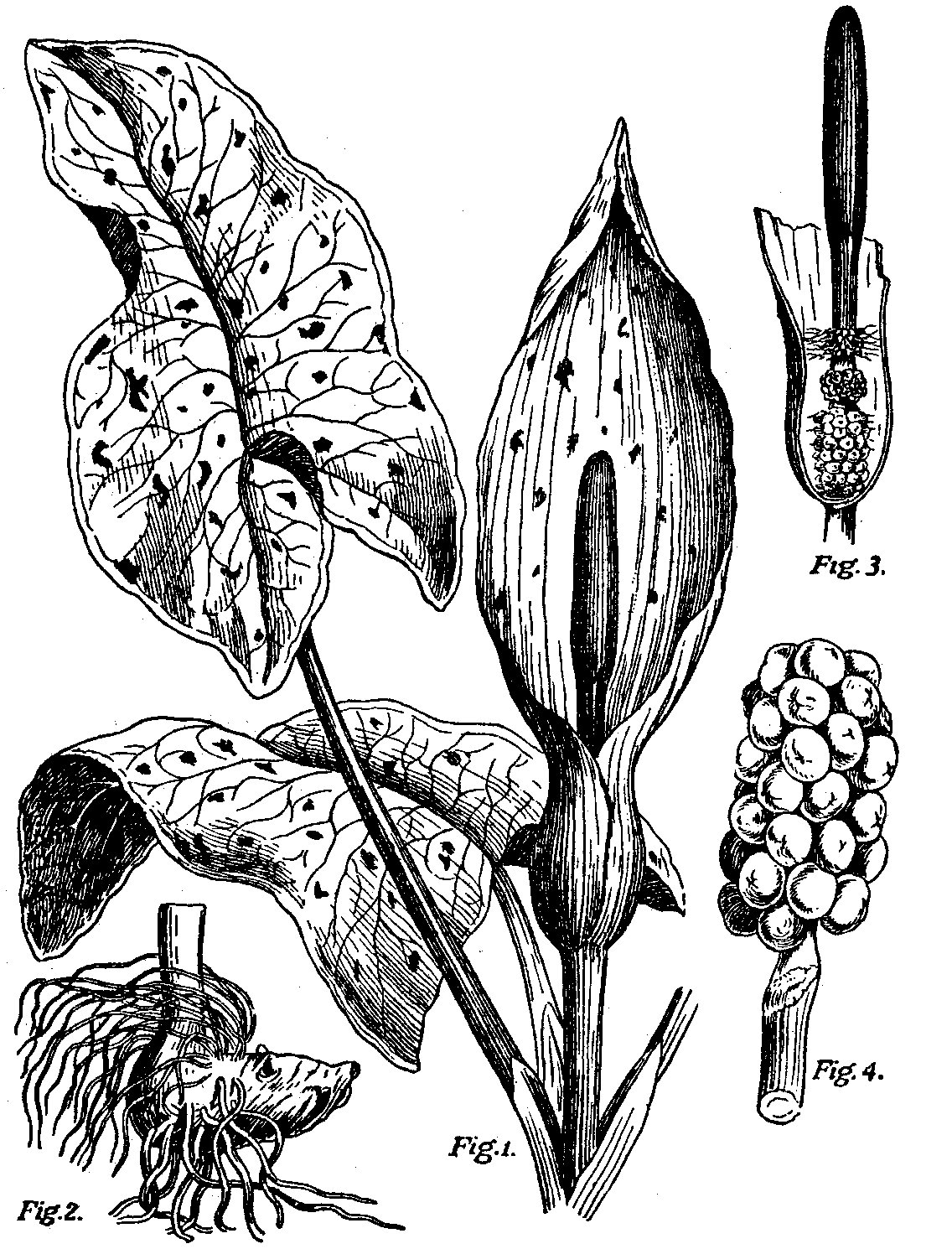
1. Leaves and inflorescence, 2. Underground root-stock, 3. Lower part of spathe cut open – showing in succession (from below) female flowers, male flowers, and sterile flowers forming a ring of hairs borne on the spadix, 4. Spike of fruits

Many small rodents appear to find the spadix particularly attractive; finding examples of the plant with much of the spadix eaten away is common. The spadix produces heat and probably scent as the flowers mature, and this may attract the rodents.

Arum maculatum is also known as cuckoo pint or cuckoo-pint in the British Isles and is named thus in Nicholas Culpeper's famous 17th-century herbal. This is a name it shares with Arum italicum (Italian lords-and-ladies), the other native British Arum. "Pint" is a shortening of the word "pintle", meaning penis, derived from the shape of the spadix. The euphemistic shortening has been traced to Turner in 1551.

The plant is propagated by birds dispersing the seeds by eating the berries. As a seedling the plant has small light green leaves that are not glossy like the mature leaves. At about 5 months its leaves grow larger and glossier. At one year old all of the leaves become glossy and die back. The next year the plant flowers during summer.

== Common names ==
A. maculatum is known by an abundance of common names including Adam and Eve, adder's meat, adder's root, arum, wild arum, arum lily, bobbins, cows and bulls, cuckoo pint , cuckoo-plant, devils and angels, friar's cowl, jack in the pulpit, lamb-in-a-pulpit, lords-and-ladies, naked boys, snakeshead, starch-root, and wake-robin. Many names refer to the plant's appearance; "lords-and-ladies" and many other names may liken the plant to male and female genitalia symbolising copulation. Starch-root is a simple description – the plant's root was used to make laundry starch and the 'lords and ladies' name may alternatively have referred to its use for starching the ruffs worn around the necks of the gentry during the late 16th and early 17th centuries.

== Distribution and habitat ==
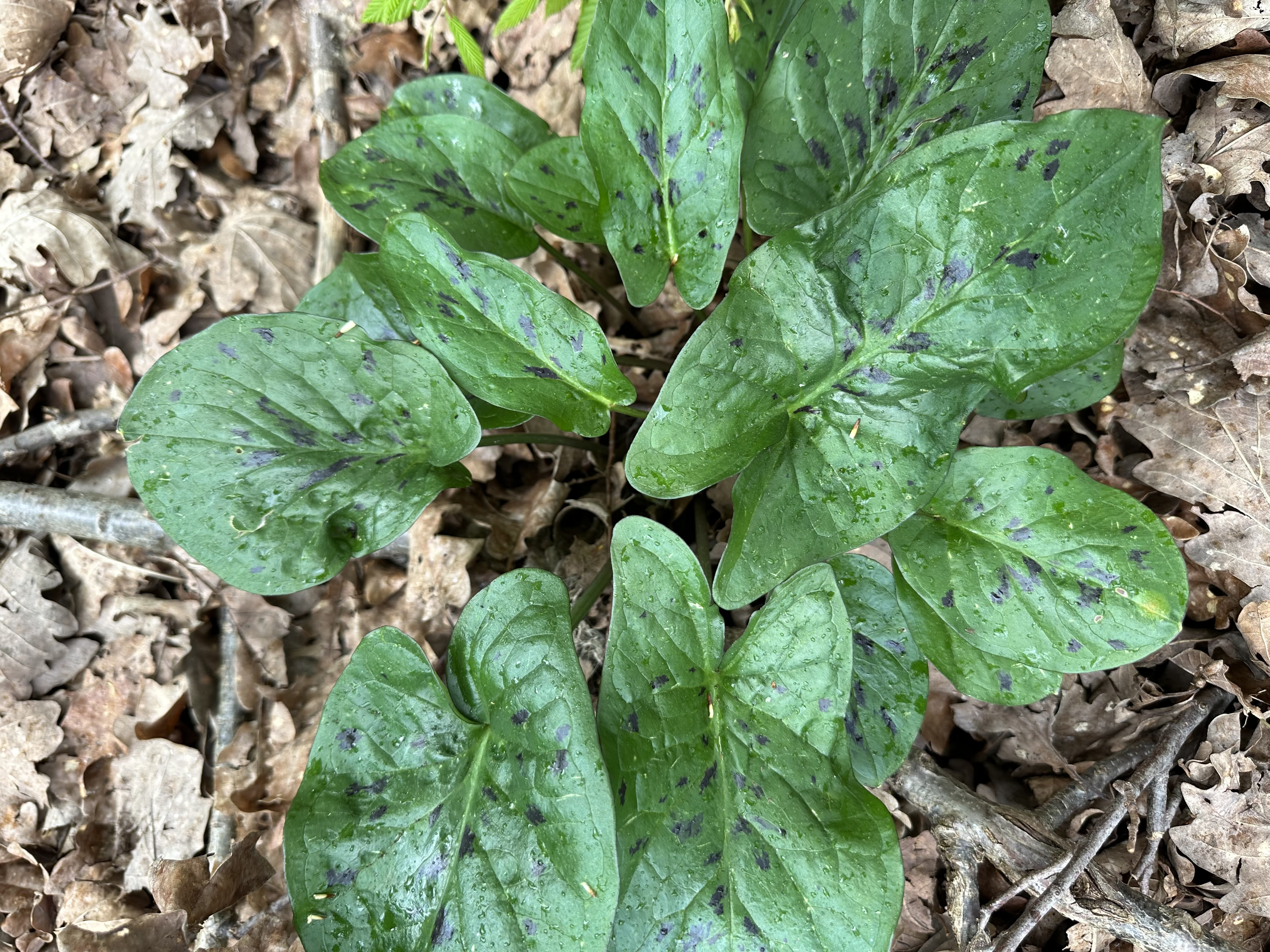
Arum maculatum in a park in Paris

It grows in woodland areas and riversides. It can occasionally grow as a weed in partly shaded spots.

== Taxonomy ==
A. maculatum is the type species of the genus Arum. Within the genus, it belongs to subgenus Arum, section Arum.

A. maculatum has a chromosome count of 2n = 56.

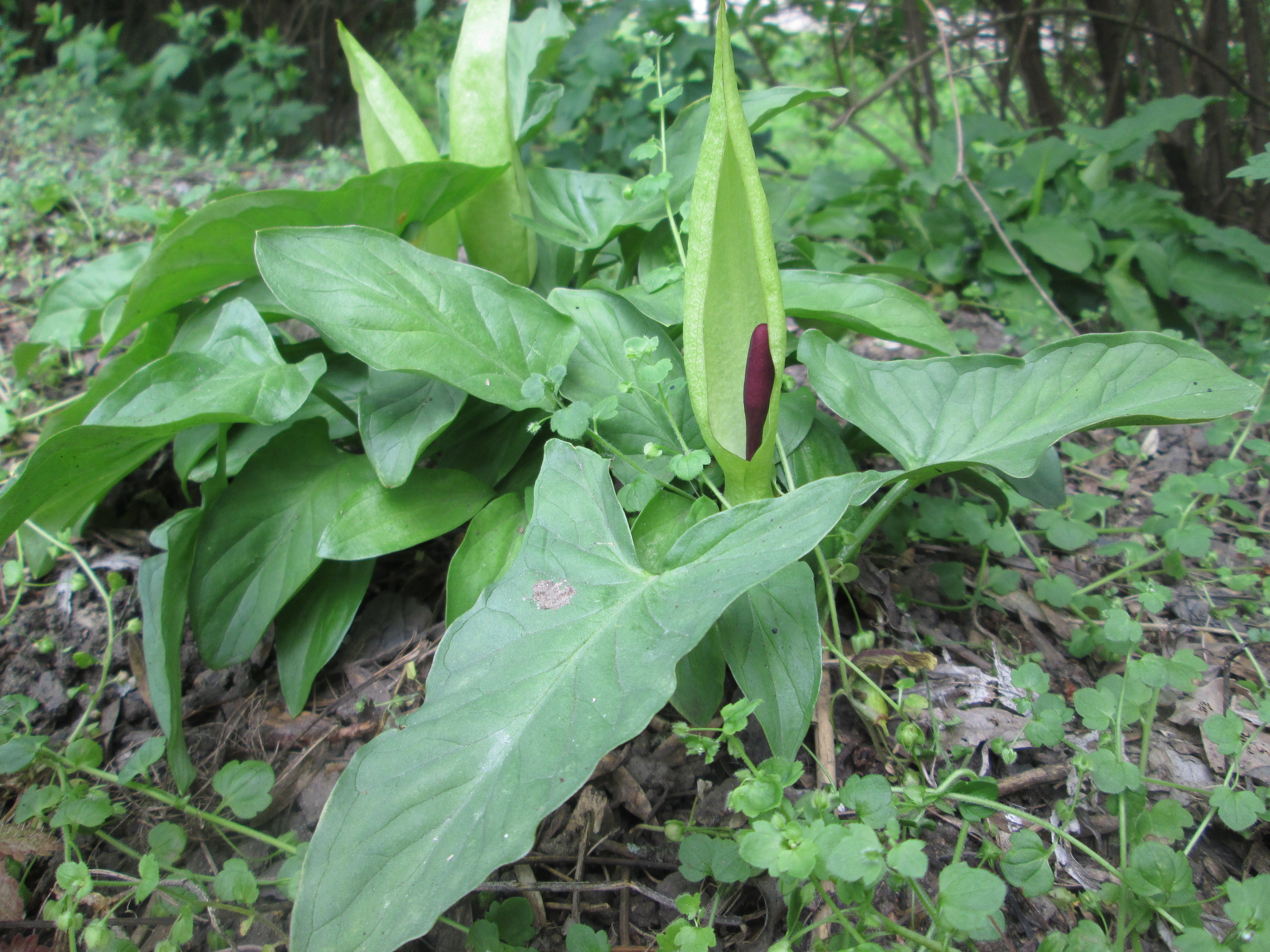
Arum maculatum

== Toxicity ==
All parts of the plant can produce allergic reactions in many people and the plant should be handled with care.

The attractive berries are extremely poisonous to many animals, including humans, but harmless to birds, which eat them and propagate the seeds. They contain oxalates of saponins, which have needle-shaped crystals that irritate the skin, mouth, tongue, and throat, and result in swelling of throat, difficulty breathing, burning pain, and upset stomach. However, their acrid taste, coupled with the almost immediate tingling sensation in the mouth when consumed, means that large amounts are rarely taken and serious harm is unusual. It is one of the most common causes of accidental plant poisoning based on attendance at hospital emergency departments.

There is no known antidote to A. maculatum poisoning. Airway management may reduce the mortality, and aggressive fluid administration may prevent renal injury.

== Uses ==
=== Culinary ===
The root of the cuckoo-pint, when roasted well, is edible and when ground was once traded under the name of Portland sago. It was used like salep (orchid flour) to make saloop, a drink popular before the introduction of tea or coffee. It was also used as a substitute for arrowroot. It can be highly toxic if not prepared correctly.

The leaves, which are toxic, can be mistaken for edible sorrel.

Arum maculatum is also used to make soup in the Andırın region of Turkey where the leaves are leavened with yogurt and boiled for long hours which eliminates toxicity. This process results in a sour soup which is called Tirşik.

The Roma of Sliven collect the leaves, dry them in a weave and boil them with several changes of water prior to using them in beef stew.

=== Cultivated ===
Arum maculatum is cultivated as an ornamental plant in traditional and woodland shade gardens. The cluster of bright red berries standing alone without foliage can be a striking landscape accent. The mottled and variegated leaf patterns can add bright interest in darker habitats.

Arum maculatum may hybridize with Arum italicum.

=== Laundry starch ===
The roots were a traditional source of starch for stiffening clothes. In 1440, the nuns of Syon Abbey in England used the roots of the cuckoo-pint flower to make starch for church linens; only starch "made of herbes" could be used for communion linen.

== Bibliography ==
- Łuczaj, Łukasz; Emre, Gizem (2025-02-13). "Lords-and-Ladies (Arum) as Food in Eurasia: A Review". Plants. 14 (4): 577. Bibcode:2025Plnts..14..577L. doi:10.3390/plants14040577. eISSN 2223-7747. PMC 11859539. PMID 40006836.
- Saygın, Sevim; Varol, Berfin; Ozdemır, Naciye; Sargin, Idris; Arslan, Gulsin (2023-10-30). "Encapsulation of edible cuckoopint (Arum maculatum) tuber powder". Selcuk University Journal of Science Faculty. 49 (2): 46–52. doi:10.35238/sufefd.1333046. eISSN 2458-9411.
- Ergene, Burçin; Karaaslan, Melek (2023). "Food, medicine or a poisonous plant: Arum maculatum L." Journal of Research in Pharmacy. 27 (2): 493–507. doi:10.29228/jrp.332. eISSN 2630-6344.
- Ivanova, Teodora; Marchev, Andrey; Chervenkov, Mihail; Bosseva, Yulia; Georgiev, Milen; Kozuharova, Ekaterina; Dimitrova, Dessislava (2023-03-15). "Catching the Green—Diversity of Ruderal Spring Plants Traditionally Consumed in Bulgaria and Their Potential Benefit for Human Health". Diversity. 15 (3): 435. Bibcode:2023Diver..15..435I. doi:10.3390/d15030435. eISSN 1424-2818.
- Ceyhan, Firuze; Akar Şahingöz, Semra (September 2022). "Using ethnobotanical plants in food preparation: Cuckoo pint (Arum maculatum L.)". International Journal of Gastronomy and Food Science. 29 100529. doi:10.1016/j.ijgfs.2022.100529. eISSN 1878-4518.
- Petrussa, Elisa; Boscutti, Francesco; Vianello, Angelo; Casolo, Valentino (2017-11-27). ""Last In–First Out": seasonal variations of non-structural carbohydrates, glucose-6-phosphate and ATP in tubers of two Arum species". Plant Biology. 20 (2): 346–356. doi:10.1111/plb.12673. eISSN 1438-8677. PMID 29181866.
- Oztürk, Munir; Altay, Volkan; Gücel, Salih; Altundağ Çakır, Çakir (2016-12-23). "Plant diversity of the drylands in Southeastern Anatolia-Turkey: role in human health and food security". Plant Biodiversity: Monitoring, Assessment and Conservation. pp. 84–124. doi:10.1079/9781780646947.00 (inactive 1 July 2025). ISBN 978-1-78064-695-4.
- Kakizaki, Yusuke; Moore, Anthony L.; Ito, Kikukatsu (2012-06-27). "Different molecular bases underlie the mitochondrial respiratory activity in the homoeothermic spadices of Symplocarpus renifolius and the transiently thermogenic appendices of Arum maculatum". Biochemical Journal. 445 (2): 237–246. doi:10.1042/BJ20111978. eISSN 1470-8728. PMC 3385843. PMID 22512685.
- Djurdjević, Lola; Popović, Zorica; Mitrović, Miroslava; Pavlović, Pavle; Jarić, Snežana; Oberan, Ljiljana; Gajić, Gordana (2008-10-01). "Dynamics of bioavailable rhizosphere soil phenolics and photosynthesis of Arum maculatum L. in a lime-beech forest". Flora - Morphology, Distribution, Functional Ecology of Plants. 203 (7): 590–601. Bibcode:2008FMDFE.203..590D. doi:10.1016/j.flora.2007.08.006. eISSN 1618-0585.
- M. Alencar, Veruska B.; et al. (September 2005). "Pro-inflammatory effect of Arum maculatum lectin and role of resident cells". The International Journal of Biochemistry & Cell Biology. 37 (9): 1805–1814. doi:10.1016/j.biocel.2005.02.027. eISSN 1878-5875. PMID 15914076.
- Majumder, Pralay; Mondal, Hossain Ali; Das, Sampa (2005-07-26). "Insecticidal activity of Arum maculatum tuber lectin and its binding to the glycosylated insect gut receptors". Journal of Agricultural and Food Chemistry. 57 (17): 6725–6729. Bibcode:2005JAFC...53.6725M. doi:10.1021/jf051155z. eISSN 1520-5118. PMID 16104791.
- Gibernau, Marc; Macquart, David; Przetak, Gilles (2004). "Pollination in the genus Arum – a review" (PDF). Aroideana. 27: 148–166. ISSN 0197-4033. Archived from the original (PDF) on 2025-01-14.
- Christie, William W. (2003-12-08). "13-Phenyltridec-9-enoic and 15-phenylpentadec-9-enoic acids in Arum maculatum seed oil". European Journal of Lipid Science and Technology. 105 (12): 779–780. doi:10.1002/ejlt.200300865. eISSN 1438-9312.
- V. Mladenov, Ivan; H. Haralambieva, Iana; D. Iankov, Ianko; G. Mitov, Ivan (2002-02-01). "Characterisation of 20-kDa lectin-spermagglutinin from Arum maculatum that prevents Chlamydia pneumoniae infection of L-929 fibroblast cells". FEMS Immunology & Medical Microbiology. 32 (3): 249–254. doi:10.1111/j.1574-695X.2002.tb00561.x. eISSN 2049-632X. PMID 11934571.
- Kite, Geoffrey C.; et al. (2000). "Inflorescence odours and pollinators of Arum and Amorphophallus (Araceae)" (PDF). Reproductive Biology in Systematics, Conservation and Economic Botany. Royal Botanic Gardens, Kew. pp. 295–315. ISBN 1900347628. Archived from the original (PDF) on 2023-03-25.
- Allen, Anthony K. (1995-05-11). "Purification and characterization of an N-acetyllactosamine-specific lectin from tubers of Arum maculatum". Biochimica et Biophysica Acta (BBA) - General Subjects. 1244 (1): 129–132. doi:10.1016/0304-4165(94)00210-o. ISSN 0304-4165. PMID 7766648.
- Van Damme, E. J.; Goossens, K.; Smeets, K.; Van Leuven, F.; Verhaert, P.; Peumans, W. J. (April 1995). "The major tuber storage protein of araceae species is a lectin (Characterization and molecular cloning of the lectin from Arum maculatum L.)". Plant Physiology. 107 (4): 1147–1158. doi:10.1104/pp.107.4.1147. ISSN 0032-0889. JSTOR 4276447. PMC 157247. PMID 7770523.
- Dring, J. V.; Kite, G. C.; Nash, R. J.; Reynolds, T. (January 1995). "Chemicals in aroids: a survey, including new results for polyhydroxy alkaloids and alkylresorcinols". Botanical Journal of the Linnean Society. 117 (1): 1–12. doi:10.1111/j.1095-8339.1995.tb02373.x. ISSN 0024-4074.
- Stahl, Egon; Kaltenbach, U. (1965). "Die basischen Inhaltsstoffe des Aronstabes ( Arum maculatum L.)". Archiv der Pharmazie. 298 (9): 599–604. doi:10.1002/ardp.19652980908.
  Translated in Kaltenbach, U.; Stahl, Egon (1970). "The Basic Components of the Cuckoopint (Arum maculatum L.)". doi:10.21236/AD0872850.
