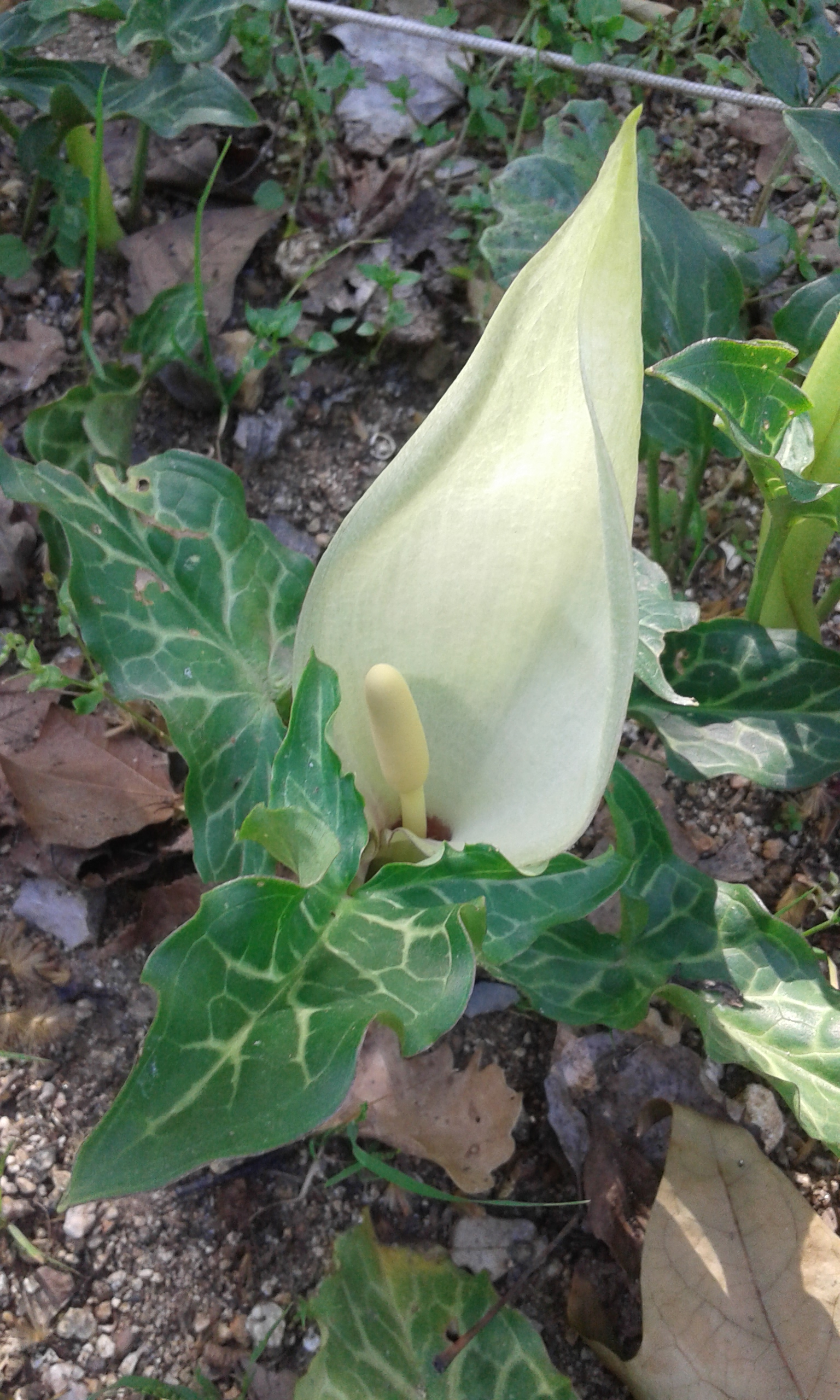

Scientific classification
- Kingdom: Plantae
- Clade: Embryophytes
- Clade: Tracheophytes
- Clade: Angiosperms
- Clade: Monocots
- Order: Alismatales
- Family: Araceae
- Genus: Arum
- Species: A. italicum

Binomial name
- Arum italicum Mill.

Subspecies
- List: Arum italicum subsp. albispathum (Steven ex Ledeb.) Prime; Arum italicum subsp. canariense (Webb & Berthel.) P.C.Boyce; Arum italicum subsp. italicum; Arum italicum subsp. neglectum (F.Towns.) Prime

Synonyms
- Species: Arisarum italicum (Mill.) Raf.; Arum maculatum var. italicum (Mill.) O.Targ.Tozz.; subsp. albispathum: Arum albispathum Steven ex Ledeb.; Arum orientale var. albispathum (Steven ex Ledeb.) Engl.; Arum orientale subsp. albispathum (Steven ex Ledeb.) Nyman; subsp. canariense: Arum canariense Webb & Berthel.; Arum italicum var. canariense (Webb & Berthel.) Engl.; subsp. italicum: Arum divaricatum Dulac; Arum facchinii Porta ex Hruby; Arum italicum var. concolor Beck; Arum italicum var. facchinii (Porta ex Hruby) Engl.; Arum italicum subsp. gaibolense Mattei; Arum italicum var. hercegovinum Beck; Arum italicum subvar. immaculatum (DC.) Engl.; Arum italicum var. immaculatum DC.; Arum italicum var. intermedium Mutel; Arum italicum var. maculatum Hoschedé; Arum italicum subsp. majoricense (Chodat) O.Bolòs, Masalles & Vigo; Arum italicum f. majoricense (Chodat) Mus, Pericás & Rosselló; Arum italicum var. parvulum Borhidi; Arum italicum f. purpurascens Pamp.; Arum italicum var. yvesii Briq.; Arum maculatum f. parvulum (Borhidi) Terpó; Arum majoricense Chodat; Arum modicense Sprenger; Arum numidicum Schott; Arum ponticum Schott; Arum provinciale Sommier ex Hruby; subsp. neglectum: Arum italicum subvar. foucaudii (Corb.) Engl.; Arum italicum subvar. obtusilobum Engl.; Arum italicum subvar. punctatum Engl.; Arum italicum var. foucaudii Corb.; Arum italicum var. neglectum F.Towns.; Arum neglectum (F.Towns.) Ridl.

= Arum italicum =

Species of flowering plant

Arum italicum is a species of flowering herbaceous perennial plant in the family Araceae, also known as Italian arum and Italian lords-and-ladies. It is native to the British Isles and much of the Mediterranean region, the Caucasus, Canary Islands, Madeira and northern Africa. It is also naturalized in Belgium, the Netherlands, Austria, Argentina, North Island New Zealand and scattered locations in North America.

== Description ==
Arum italicum grows 30–46 cm (1–1.5 ft) high, with equal spread. It blooms in spring with white flowers that turn to showy red fruit.

By relative inflorescence height, Arum species are divided into "cryptic" species, whose inflorescences are borne on a short peduncle amid or below the leaves, and "flag" species, whose inflorescences are above leaf level at the end of long peduncles. A. italicum is a cryptic species.

In 1778, Lamarck noticed that the inflorescence of this plant produces heat.

A. italicum generally has a chromosome count of 2n = 84, except that a few subspecies (such as subsp. albispathum) have 2n = 56.

== Taxonomy ==
Within the genus, A. italicum belongs to subgenus Arum, section Arum.

Arum italicum may hybridize with Arum maculatum. The status of two subspecies currently included in Arum italicum, subsp. albispathum (Crimea to the Caucasus) and subsp. canariense (Macaronesia), is uncertain and they may represent independent species.

== Distribution and habitat ==
Arum italicum nativity by subspecies is as follows:

- A. italicum subsp. italicum is native to Albania, Algeria, Baleares, Bulgaria, Corse, Cyprus, France, Greece, Iraq, Italy, Kriti, Krym, Morocco, Portugal, Sardegna, Sicilia, Spain, Switzerland, Tunisia, Turkey, Turkey-in-Europe, and Yugoslavia.
- A. italicum subsp. albispathum is native to Krym, North Caucasus, Transcaucasus, and Turkey.
- A. italicum subsp. canariense is native to Azores, Canary Islands, and Madeira.
- A. italicum subsp. neglectum is native to Algeria, France, Great Britain, Morocco, and Spain.

Subspecies italicum has a multi-continental introduced presence, including in northeast Argentina, Austria, Belgium, Germany, Great Britain, Ireland, the Netherlands, north New Zealand, and the U.S. states of Illinois, California, Maryland, Missouri, New York, and North Carolina.

== Invasive species ==
Arum italicum can be invasive in some areas, particularly in the Pacific Northwest of the United States. It is very difficult to control once established. Herbicides kill the foliage of the plant, but may not affect the tuber. Manual control may spread the plants through the dissemination of soil contaminated with bulb and root fragments.

== Uses ==
In Croatia, its corms were eaten in times of famine.

== Toxicity ==
Leaves, fruits and rhizomes contain compounds that make them poisonous. Notably, the plants are rich in oxalates. The ingestion of the tuber may be fatal, as it affects the kidneys, digestive tract, and brain. Additionally, the sap of the plant can cause skin irritation, so it is recommended that gloves should be worn when removing it from an area.

== Cultivation ==
It is cultivated as an ornamental plant for traditional and woodland shade gardens. Subspecies italicum (the one normally grown in horticulture) has distinctive pale veins on the leaves, whilst subspecies neglectum (known as late cuckoo pint) has faint pale veins, and the leaves may have dark spots. Nonetheless, intermediates between these two subspecies also occur, and their distinctiveness has been questioned. Some gardeners use this arum to underplant with Hosta, as they produce foliage sequentially: when the Hosta withers away, the arum replaces it in early winter, maintaining ground-cover. Numerous cultivars have been developed for garden use, of which A. italicum subsp. italicum 'Marmoratum' has gained the Royal Horticultural Society's Award of Garden Merit.

== Gallery ==
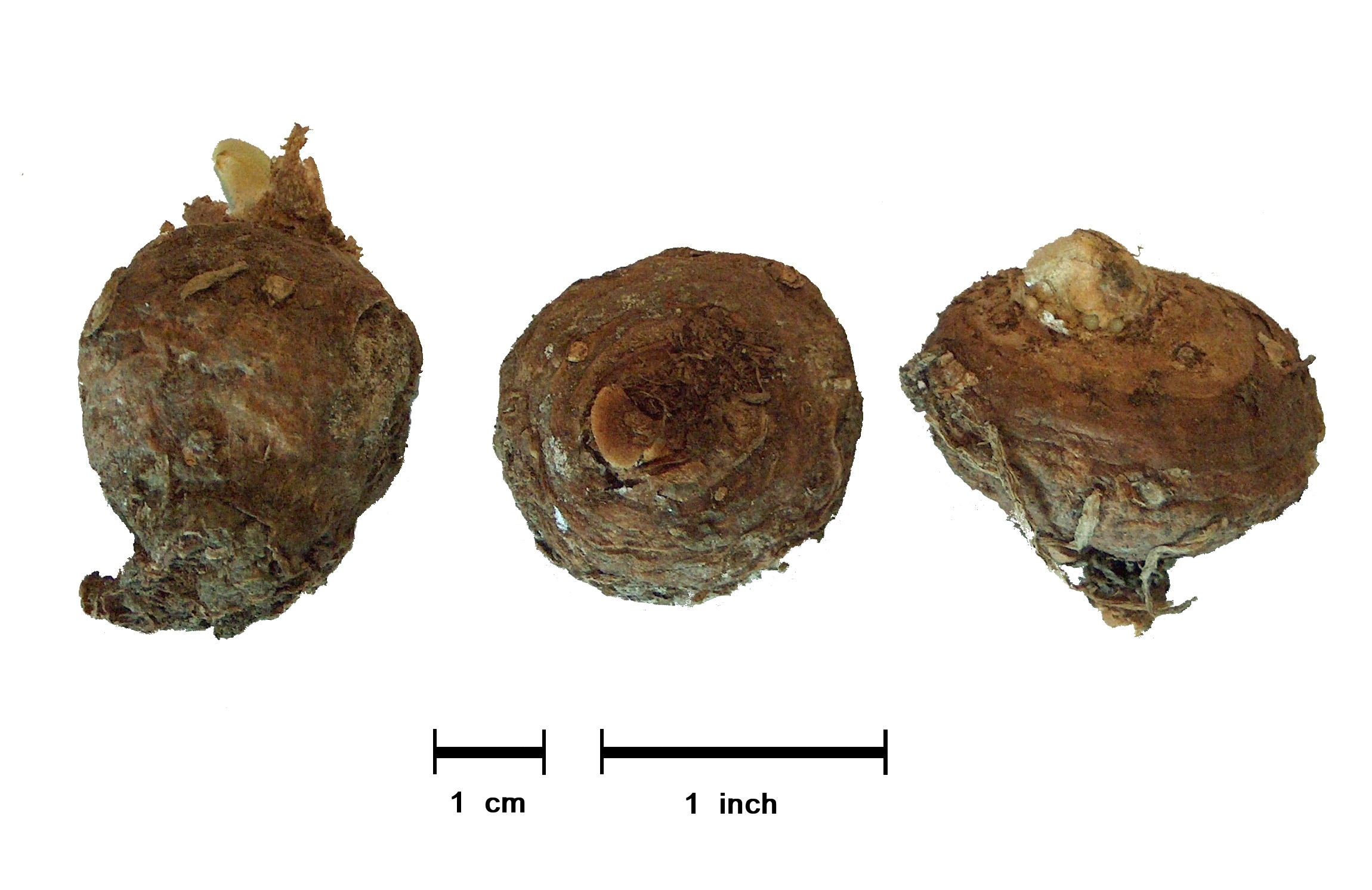
Corms

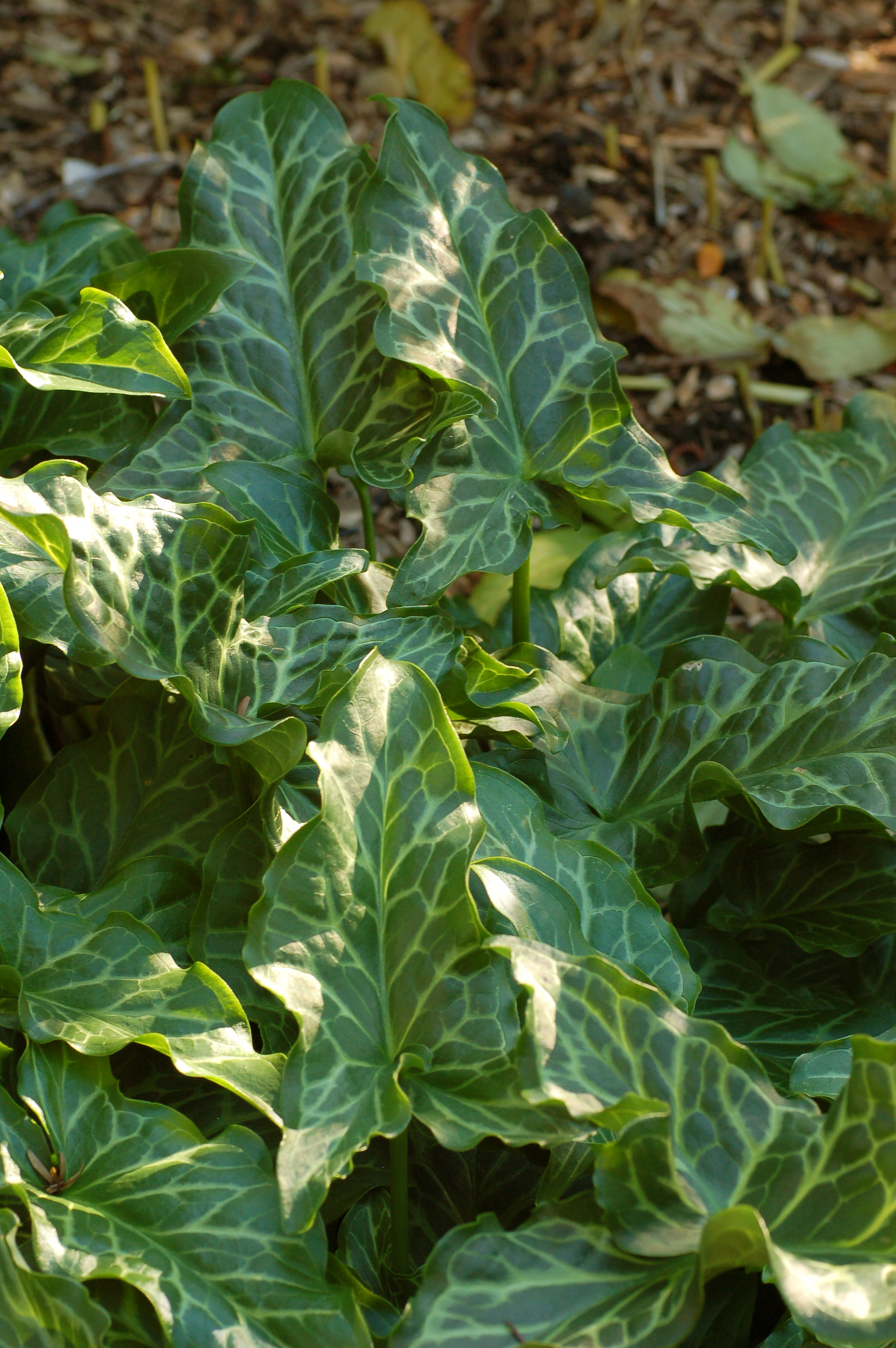
Mature leaves

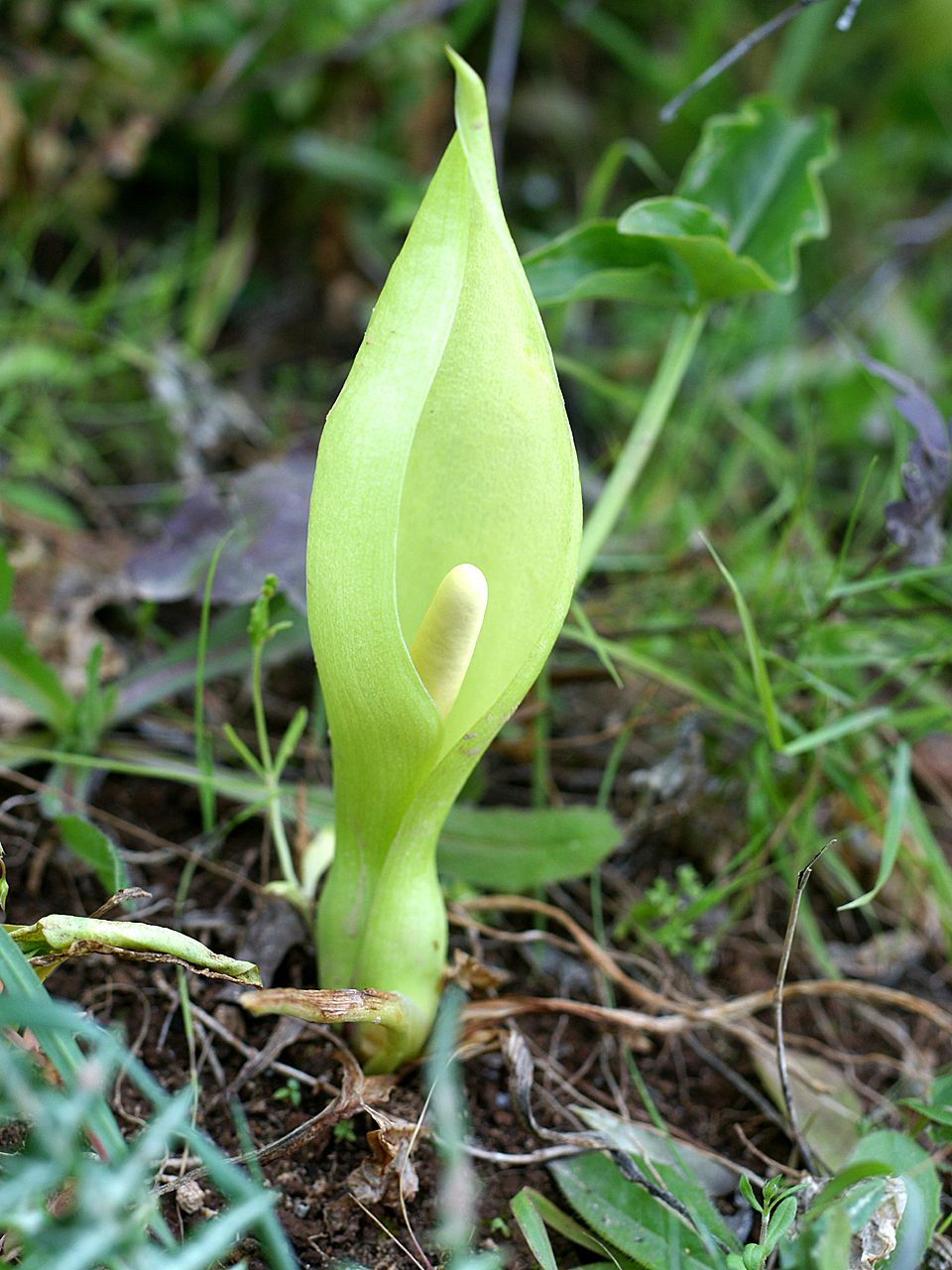
Spathe

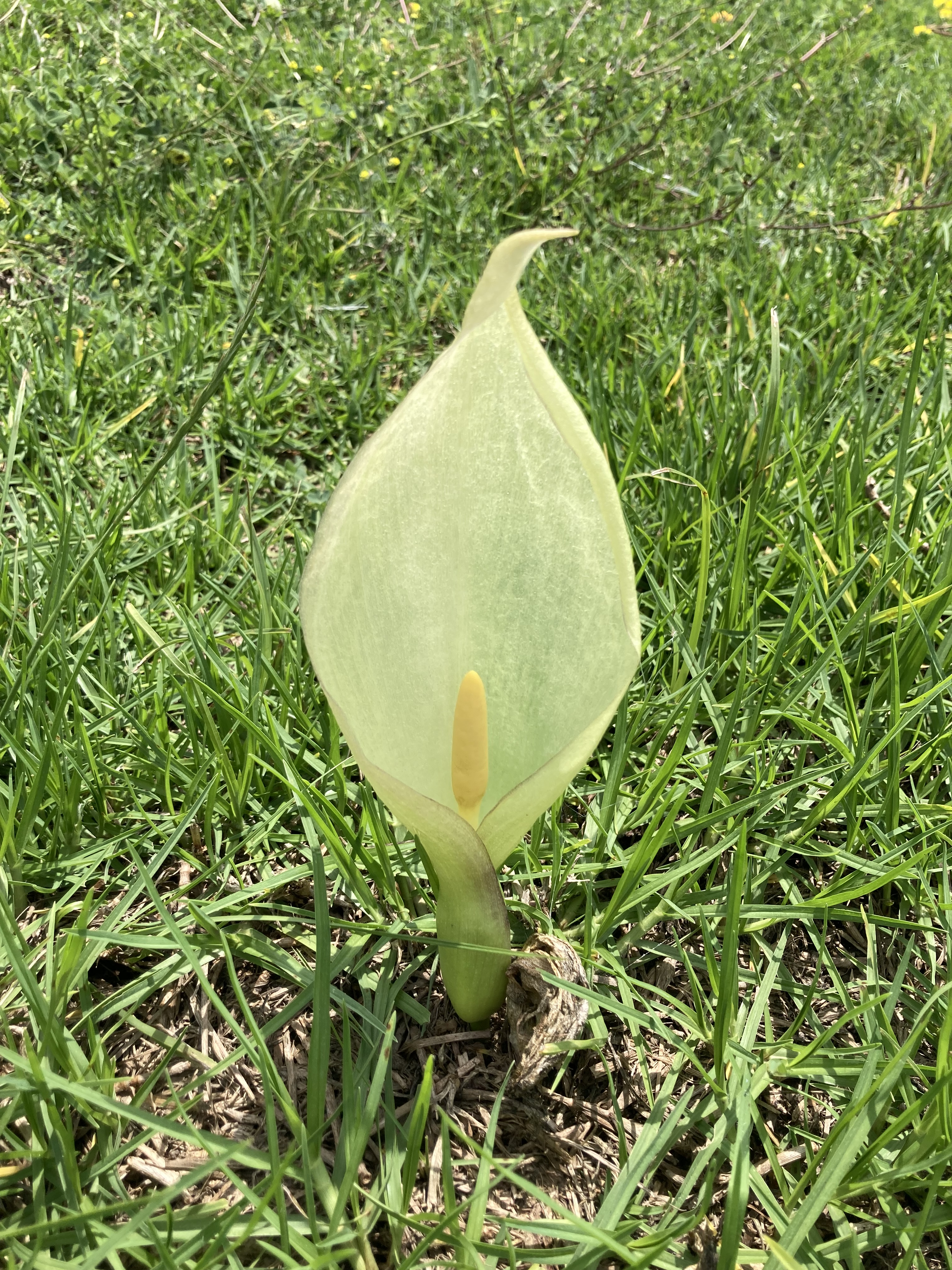
Mature flower seen at Ancient Olympia

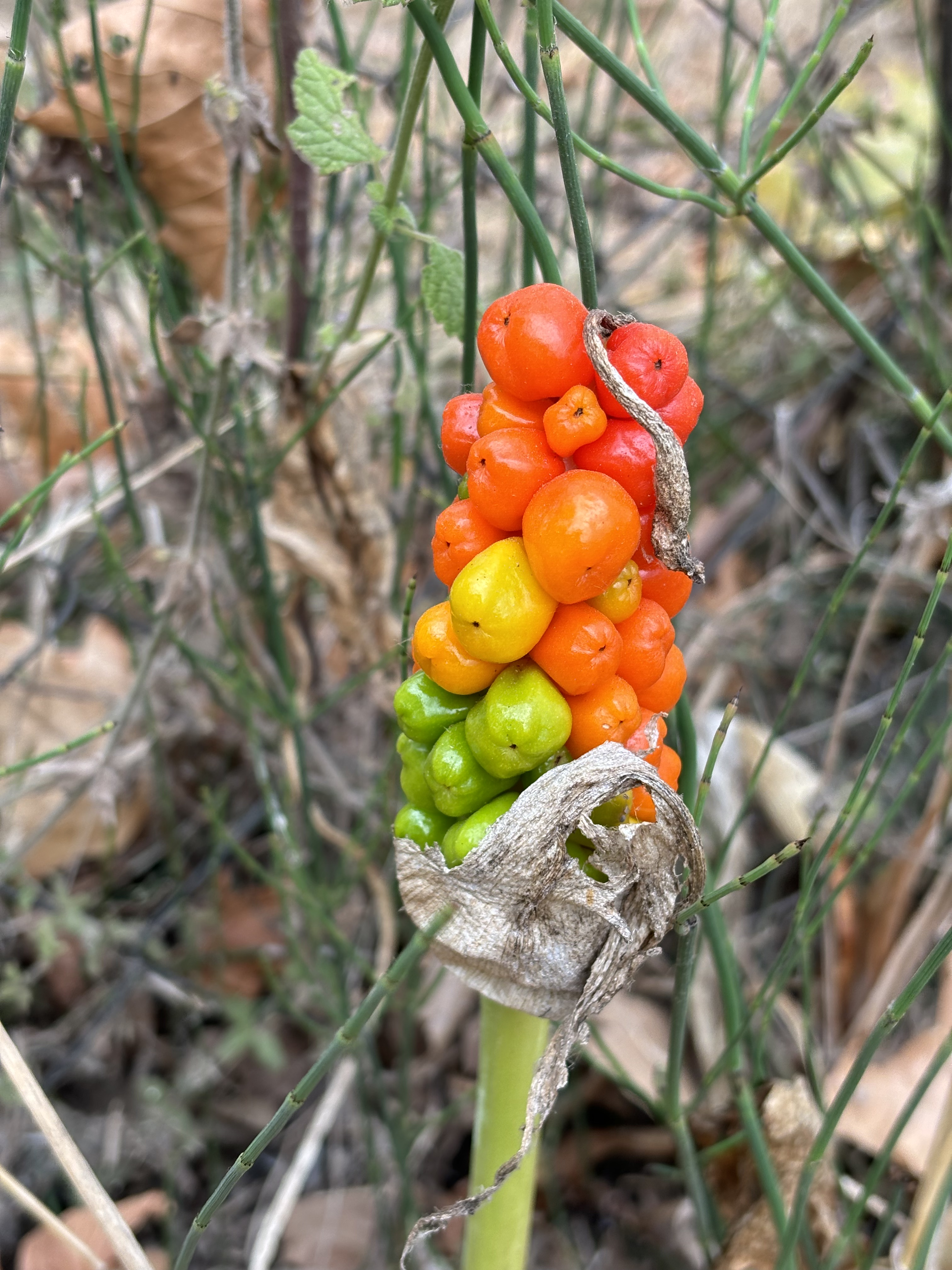
Maturing fruit

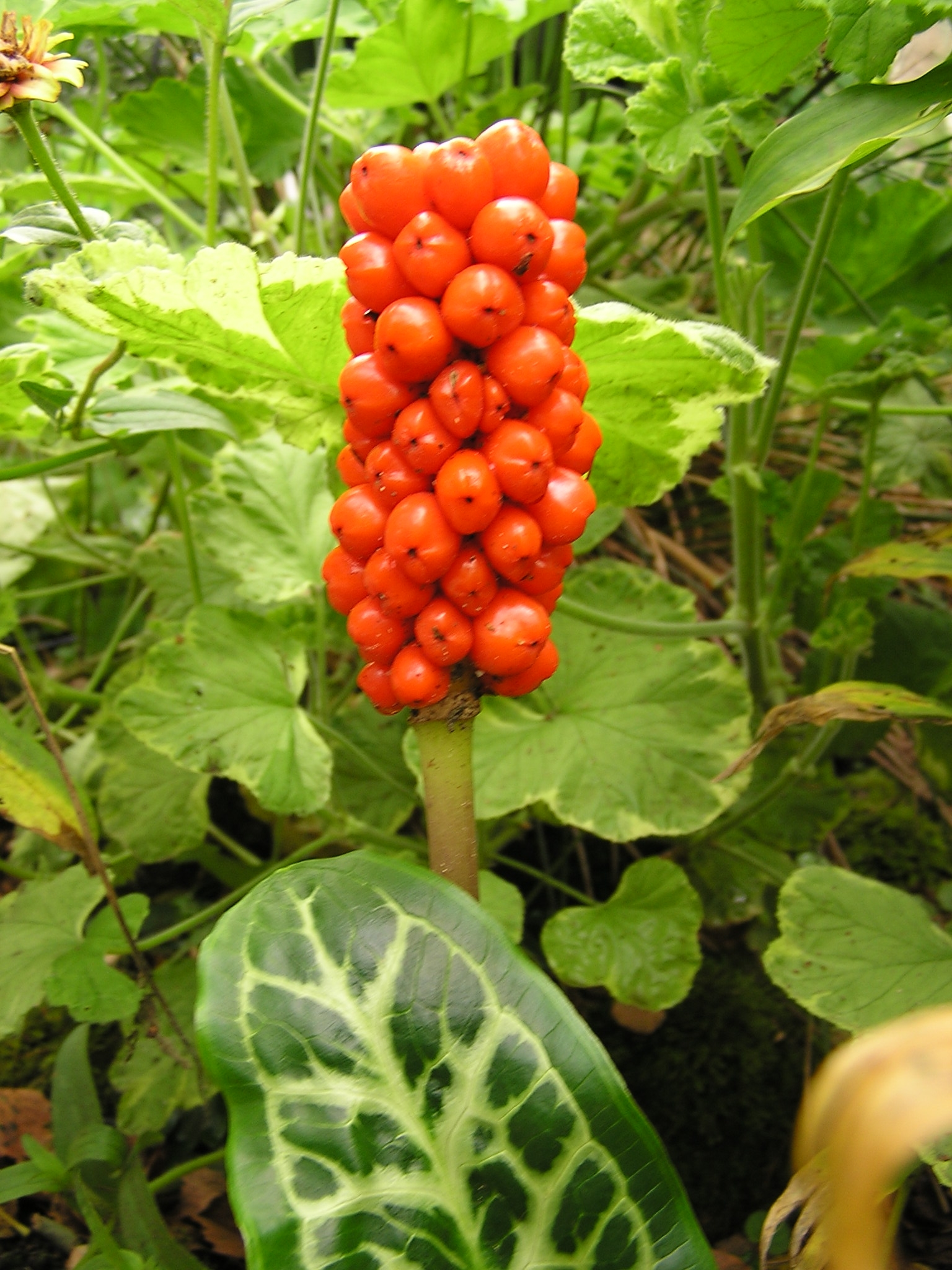
Ripe fruit

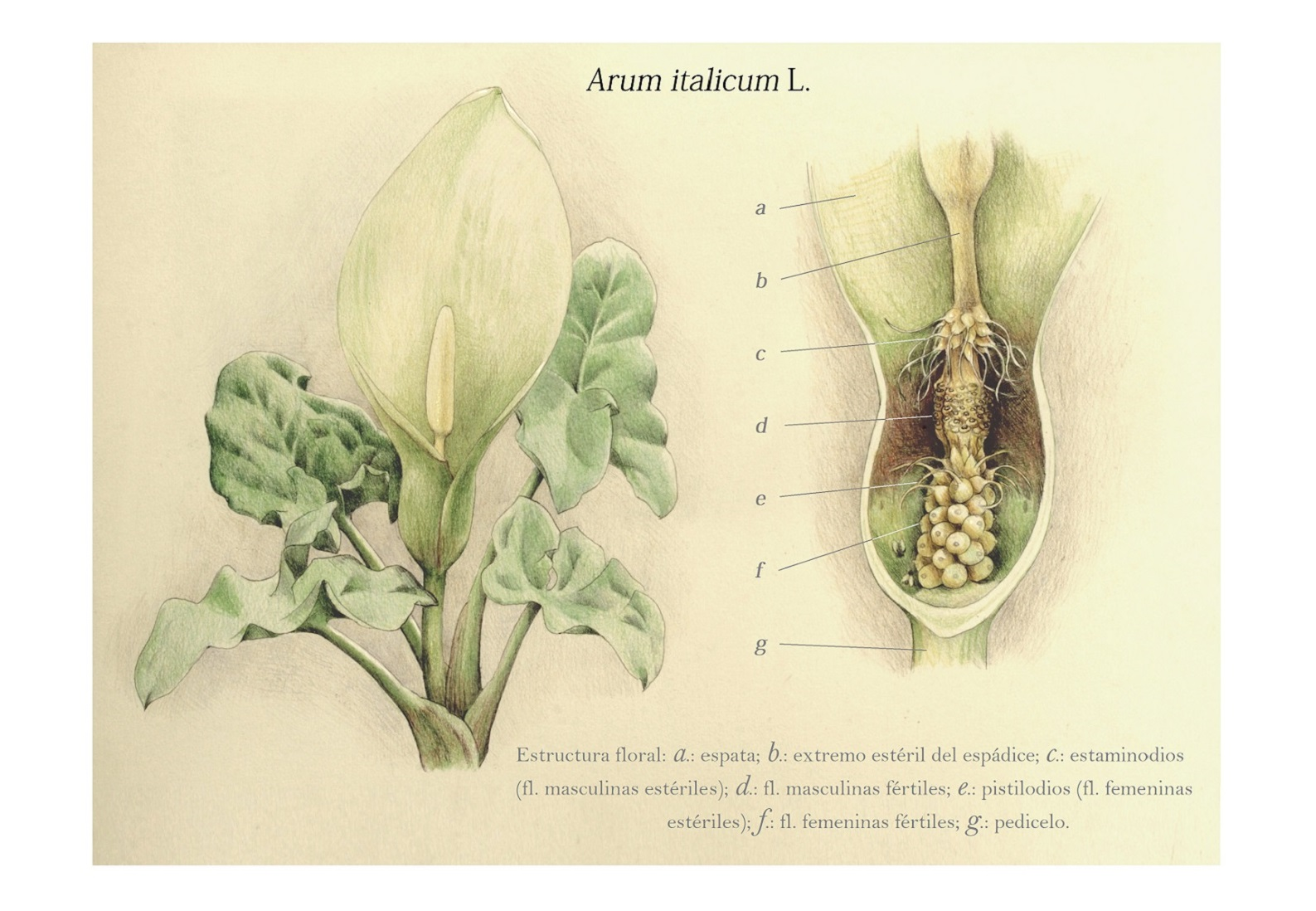
Botanical illustration

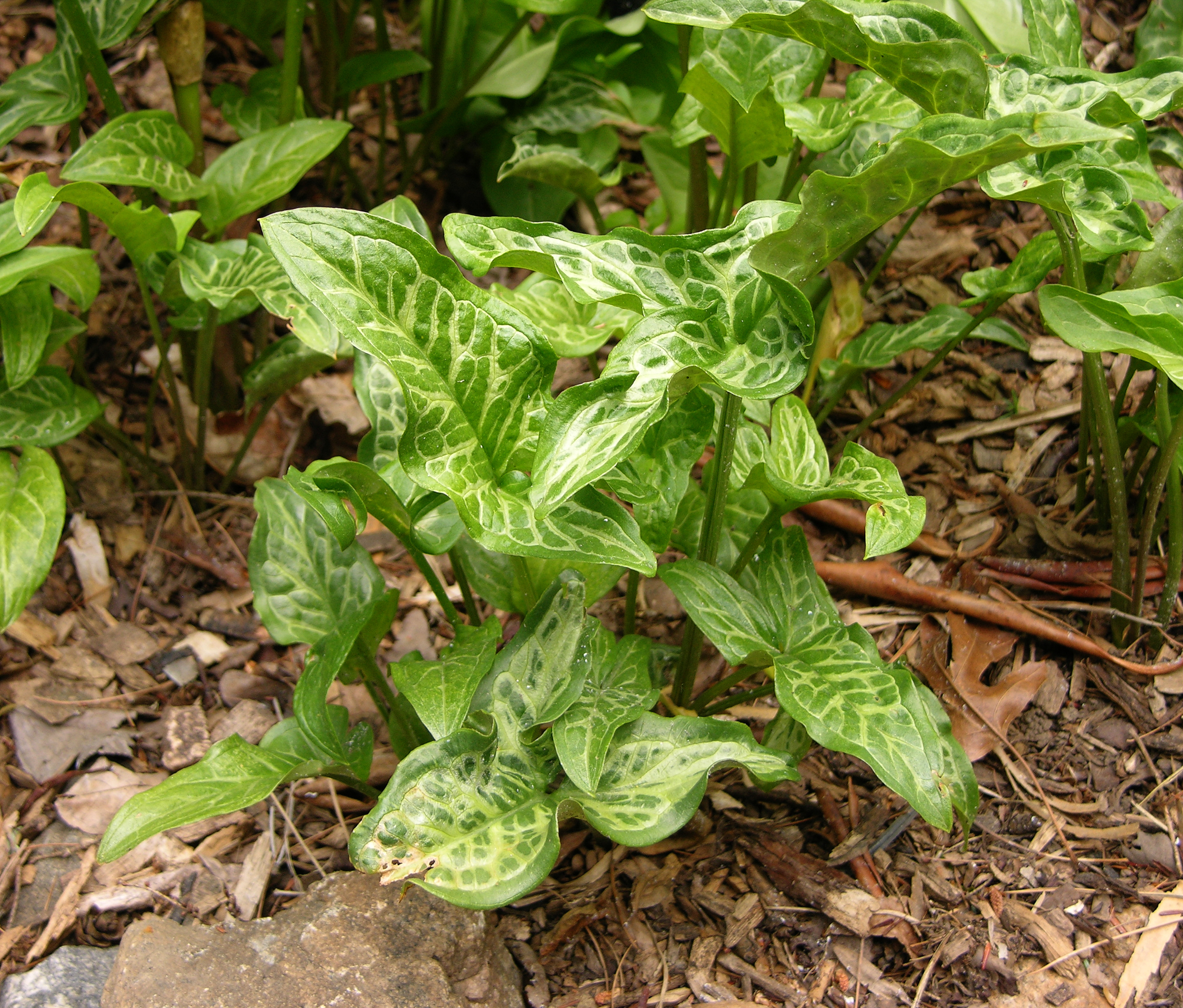
Leaves of cultivar 'Marmoratum'

== Bibliography ==
- Łuczaj, Łukasz; Emre, Gizem (2025-02-13). "Lords-and-Ladies (Arum) as Food in Eurasia: A Review". Plants. 14 (4): 577. Bibcode:2025Plnts..14..577L. doi:10.3390/plants14040577. eISSN 2223-7747. PMC 11859539. PMID 40006836.
- Bussmann, Rainer W.; Batsatsashvili, Ketevan; Kikvidze, Zaal; Paniagua-Zambrana, Narel Y.; Khutsishvili, Manana; Maisaia, Inesa; Sikharulidze, Shalva; Tchelidze, David (2020-06-27). "Arum italicum subsp. albispathum. Ethnobotany of the mountain regions of far Eastern Europe: Ural, Northern Caucasus, Turkey, and Iran". Ethnobotany of the Mountain Regions of Far Eastern Europe: Ural, Northern Caucasus, Turkey, and Iran. pp. 147–152. doi:10.1007/978-3-030-28940-9_17. ISBN 978-3-030-28940-9.
- Demir, Esra; Turfan, Nezahat; Özer, Harun; Üstün, Nebahat Şule; Pekşen, Aysun (2020-02-21). "Nutrient and bioactive substance contents of edible plants grown naturally in Salipazari (Samsun)". Acta Scientiarum Polonorum Hortorum Cultus. 19 (1): 151–160. doi:10.24326/asphc.2020.1.14. eISSN 2545-1405.
- Petrussa, Elisa; Boscutti, Francesco; Vianello, Angelo; Casolo, Valentino (2017-11-27). ""Last In–First Out": seasonal variations of non-structural carbohydrates, glucose-6-phosphate and ATP in tubers of two Arum species". Plant Biology. 20 (2): 346–356. doi:10.1111/plb.12673. eISSN 1438-8677. PMID 29181866.
- Oztürk, Munir; Altay, Volkan; Gücel, Salih; Altundağ Çakır, Çakir (2016-12-23). "Plant diversity of the drylands in Southeastern Anatolia-Turkey: role in human health and food security". Plant Biodiversity: Monitoring, Assessment and Conservation. pp. 84–124. doi:10.1079/9781780646947.00 (inactive 23 July 2025). ISBN 978-1-78064-695-4.
- Łuczaj, Łukasz; Pieroni, Andrea (2016-04-12). "Nutritional ethnobotany in Europe: from emergency foods to healthy folk cuisines and contemporary foraging trends" (PDF). Mediterranean Wild Edible Plants: Ethnobotany and Food Composition Tables. pp. 33–56. doi:10.1007/978-1-4939-3329-7_3. ISBN 978-1-4939-3329-7.
- Łuczaj, Łukasz; Pieroni, Andrea; Tardío, Javier; Pardo-de-Santayana, Manuel; Sõukand, Renata; Svanberg, Ingvar; Kalle, Raivo (2012-11-19). "Wild food plant use in 21st century Europe: the disappearance of old traditions and the search for new cuisines involving wild edibles". Acta Societatis Botanicorum Poloniae. 81 (4): 359–370. Bibcode:2012AcSBP..81..359L. doi:10.5586/asbp.2012.031. eISSN 2083-9480. hdl:10278/3695496.
- Salik, Serap; Alpinar, Kerim; Imre, Sedat (2007-05-05). "Fatty acid composition of the seed oil of Arum italicum Miller". Journal of Food Lipids. 9 (2): 95–103. doi:10.1111/j.1745-4522.2002.tb00212.x. ISSN 1065-7258.
- Harrison, A. P.; Bartels, E. M. (2006-06-30). "A Modern Appraisal of Ancient Etruscan Herbal Practices". American Journal of Pharmacology and Toxicology. 1 (2): 26–29. doi:10.3844/ajptsp.2006.26.29. eISSN 1557-4970.
- Gibernau, Marc; Macquart, David; Przetak, Gilles (2004). "Pollination in the genus Arum – a review" (PDF). Aroideana. 27: 148–166. ISSN 0197-4033. Archived from the original (PDF) on 2025-01-14.
- Bonora, Angelo; Pancaldi, Simonetta; Gualandri, Rita; Palmira Fasulo, Maria (2000-05-01). "Carotenoid and ultrastructure variations in plastids of Arum italicum Miller fruit during maturation and ripening Get access Arrow". Journal of Experimental Botany. 51 (346): 873–884. doi:10.1093/jexbot/51.346.873. ISSN 0022-0957.
- Kite, Geoffrey C.; et al. (2000). "Inflorescence odours and pollinators of Arum and Amorphophallus (Araceae)" (PDF). Reproductive Biology in Systematics, Conservation and Economic Botany. Royal Botanic Gardens, Kew. pp. 295–315. ISBN 1900347628. Archived from the original (PDF) on 2023-03-25.
- Dring, J. V.; Kite, G. C.; Nash, R. J.; Reynolds, T. (January 1995). "Chemicals in aroids: a survey, including new results for polyhydroxy alkaloids and alkylresorcinols". Botanical Journal of the Linnean Society. 117 (1): 1–12. doi:10.1111/j.1095-8339.1995.tb02373.x. ISSN 0024-4074.
- Della Greca, Marina; Molinaro, Antonio; Monaco, Pietro; Previtera, Lucio (February 1994). "Lignans from Arum italicum". Phytochemistry. 35 (3): 777–779. Bibcode:1994PChem..35..777G. doi:10.1016/S0031-9422(00)90604-6. ISSN 0031-9422.
- Della Greca, Marina; Fiorentino, Antonio; Molinaro, Antonio; Monaco, Pietro; Previtera, Lucio (1993) [published 1992-11-03]. "Steroidal 5, 6-epoxides from Arum italicum". Natural Product Letters. 2 (1): 27–32. doi:10.1080/10575639308043450. ISSN 1057-5634.
- Grlić, Ljubiša (1986). Enciklopedija samoniklog jestivog bilja [Encyclopedia of Wild Edible Plants] (in Serbo-Croatian) (1st ed.). Zagreb: August Cesarec.
  - — (1990). Enciklopedija samoniklog jestivog bilja [Encyclopedia of Wild Edible Plants]. Biblioteka Priručnici (in Serbo-Croatian) (2nd ed.). Zagreb: August Cesarec. ISBN 86-393-0172-7.
  - — (2005). Enciklopedija samoniklog jestivog bilja [Encyclopedia of Wild Edible Plants]. Biblioteka Natura (in Serbo-Croatian) (3rd ed.). Rijeka: Ex libris. ISBN 953-6932-23-7.
- Hruby, Johann (1912). "Le genre Arum: Aperçu systématique avec considérations spéciales sur les relations phylogénétiques des formes" [The Genus Arum: A Systematic Overview with Special Considerations on the Phylogenetic Relations of its Forms]. Bulletin de la Société botanique de Genève II (in French) (4). Geneva: 113–160. ISSN 0366-3108.
