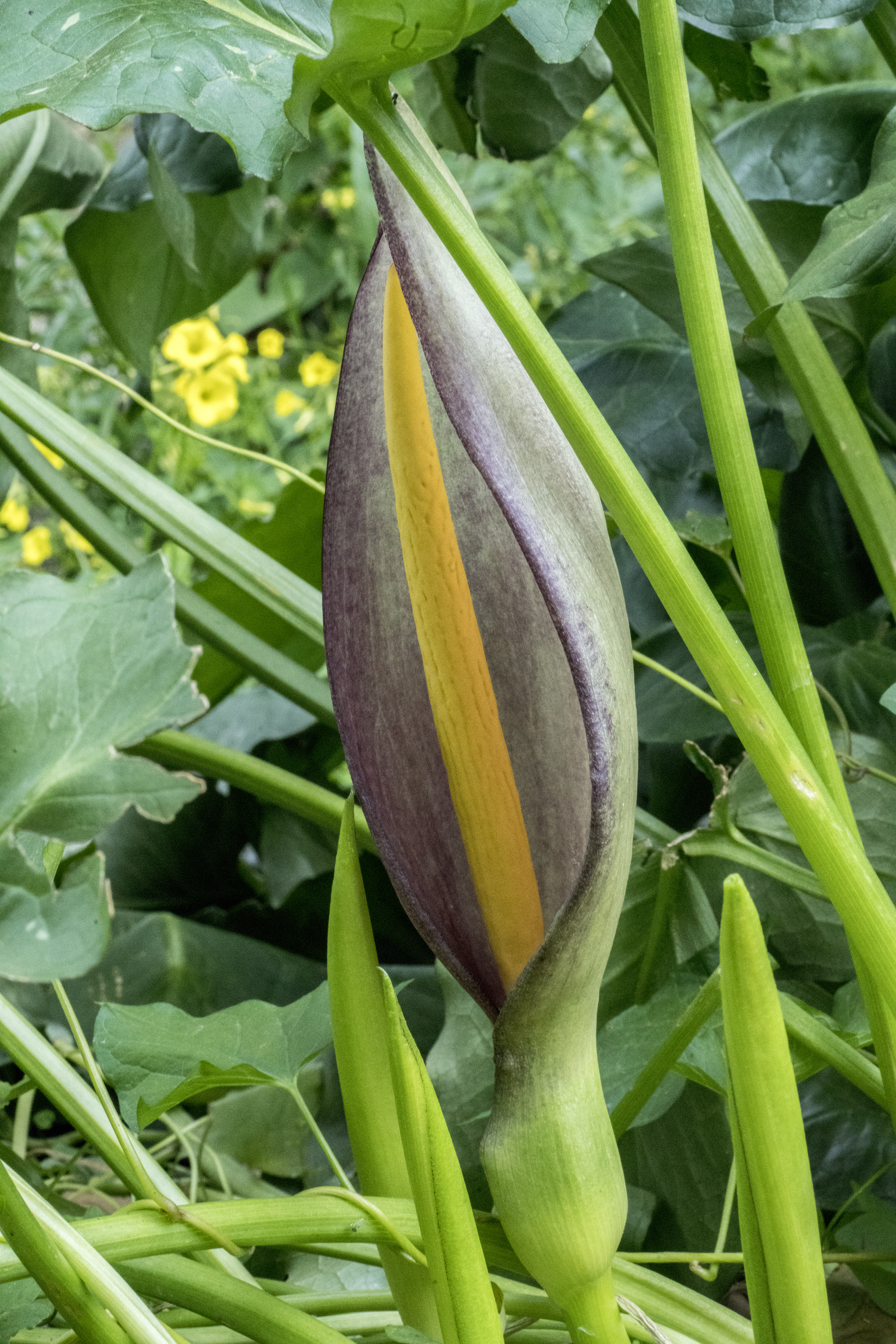
- Arum concinnatum inflorescence

Scientific classification
- Kingdom: Plantae
- Clade: Embryophytes
- Clade: Tracheophytes
- Clade: Angiosperms
- Clade: Monocots
- Order: Alismatales
- Family: Araceae
- Genus: Arum
- Species: A. concinnatum

Binomial name
- Arum concinnatum Schott

Synonyms
- Arum byzantinum Schott; Arum marmoratum Schott; Arum nickelii Schott; Arum italicum var. concinnatum (Schott) Engler; Arum italicum var. byzantinum f. purpureopetiolatum Engler; Arum italicum var. byzantinum f. viridipetiolatum Engler; Arum italicum subsp. concinnatum (Schott) Richter; Arum wettsteinii Hruby; Arum italicum var. concinnatum subvar. marmoratum (Schott) Engler; Arum italicum var. concinnatum subvar. nickelii (Schott) Engler; Arum italicum var. concinnatum subvar. wettsteinii (Hruby) Engler; Arum italicum var. sieberi Engler; Arum italicum subsp. concinnatum (Schott) Engler

= Arum concinnatum =

Species of flowering plant

Arum concinnatum, commonly known as the Crete arum, is a flowering plant species in the family Araceae.

== Habitat ==
Arum concinnatum occurs in a variety of habitats including ditches, wet areas and Olea europaea groves from sea level to 350 m (1,150 ft) of altitude. The species occurs from the southern tip of the Peloponnese to south-western Turkey, as well as most eastern Mediterranean islands.

== Taxonomy ==
Within the genus Arum, it belongs to subgenus Arum and section Arum. The species is related to Arum italicum, with which it shares similar horizontally-oriented rhizomatous tubers and hexaploid chromosome counts (2n = 84).

A. concinnatum is often incorrectly called Arum byzantinum in horticulture. However, the true A. byzantinum is a smaller diploid species from NW Turkey with small, purple spadix appendices.

== Gallery ==
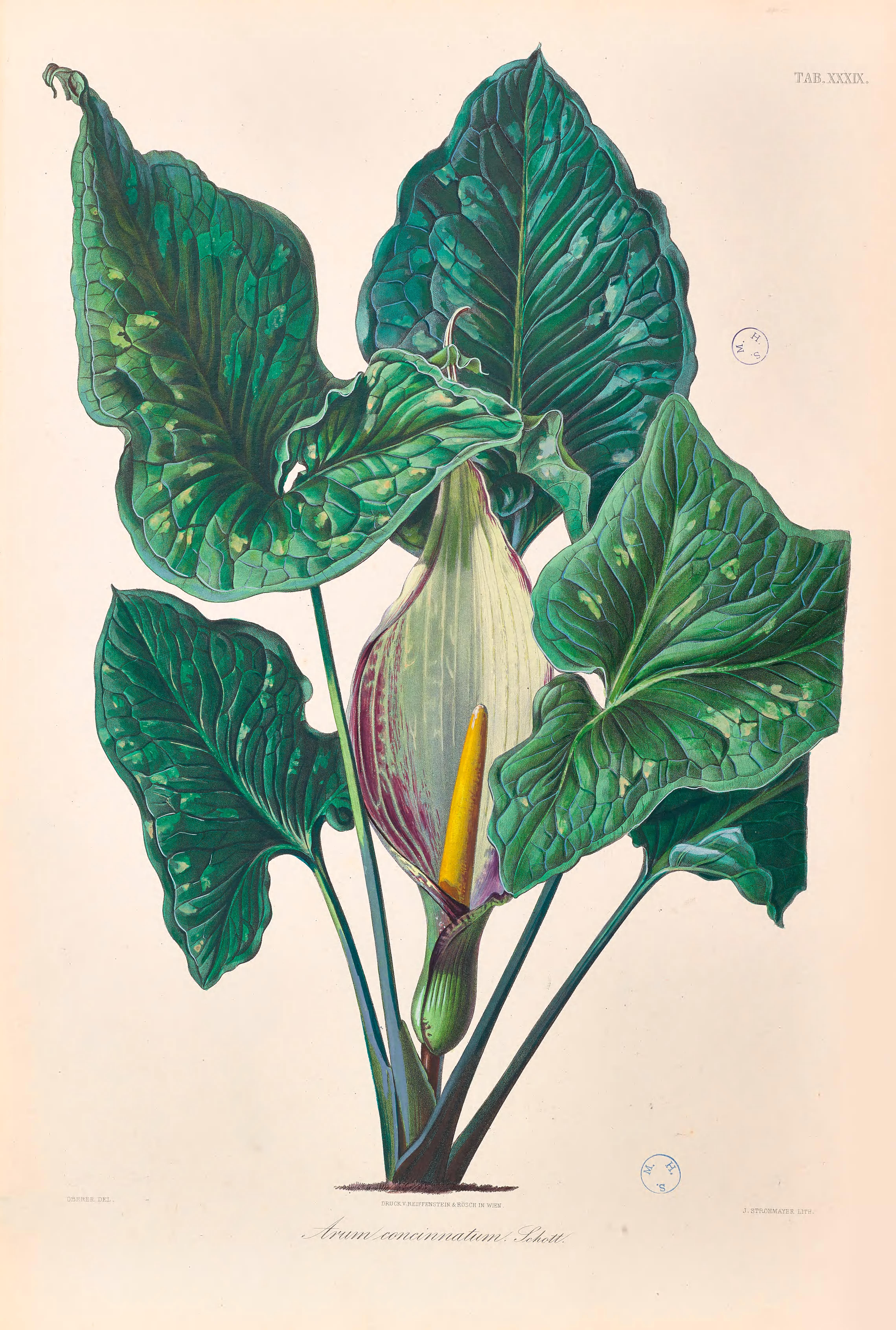
Illustration

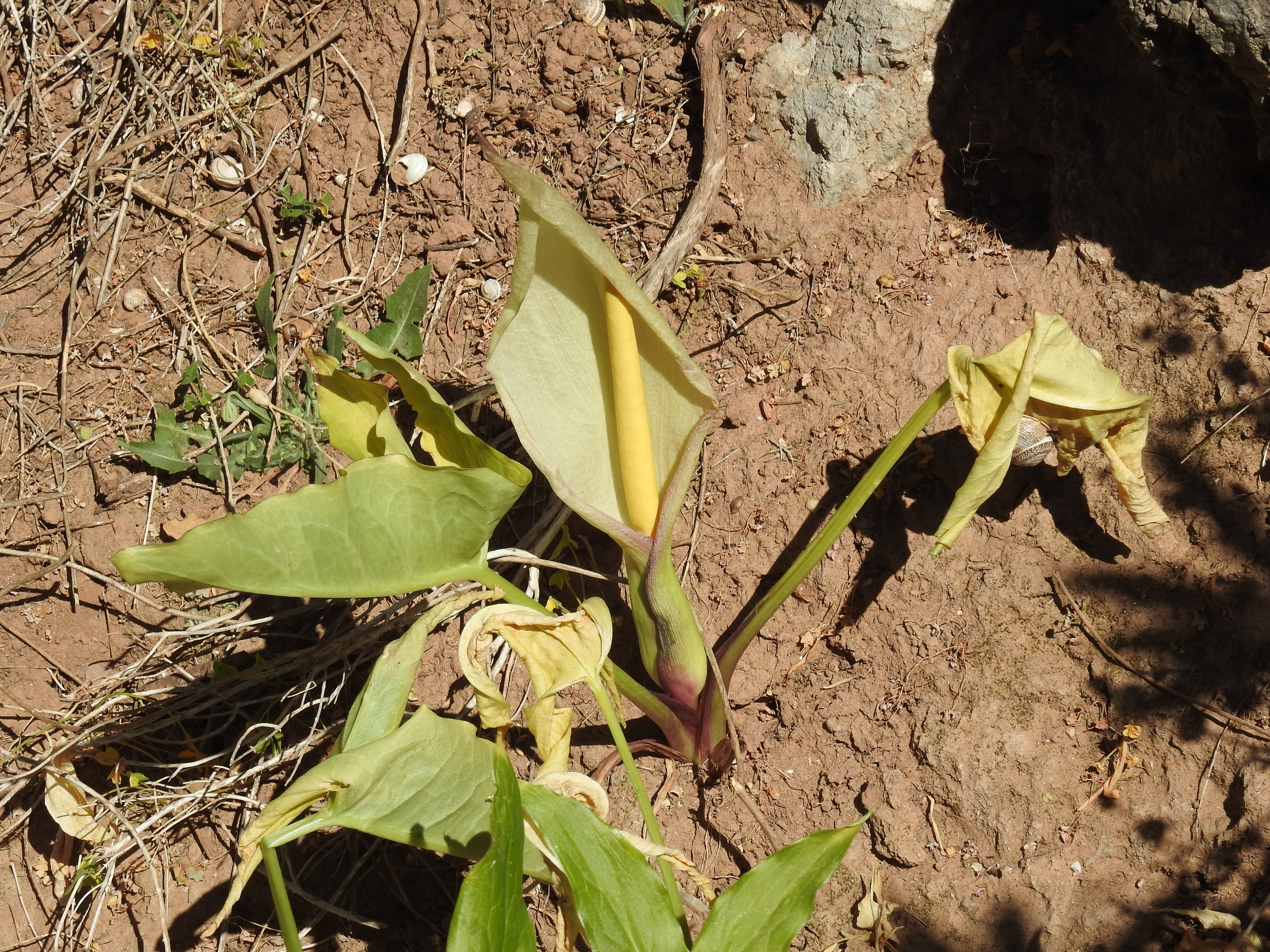
Whole plant

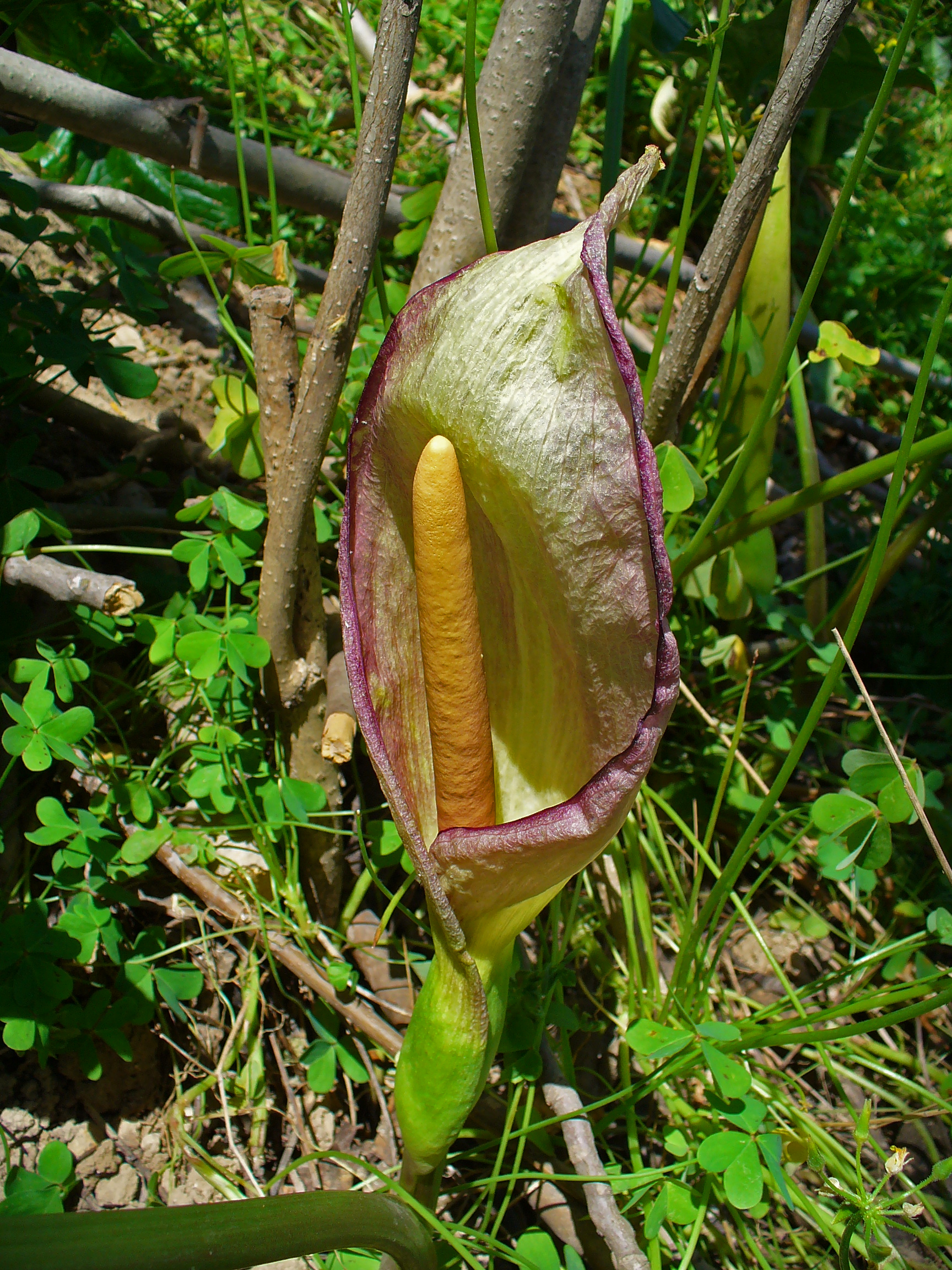
Flower

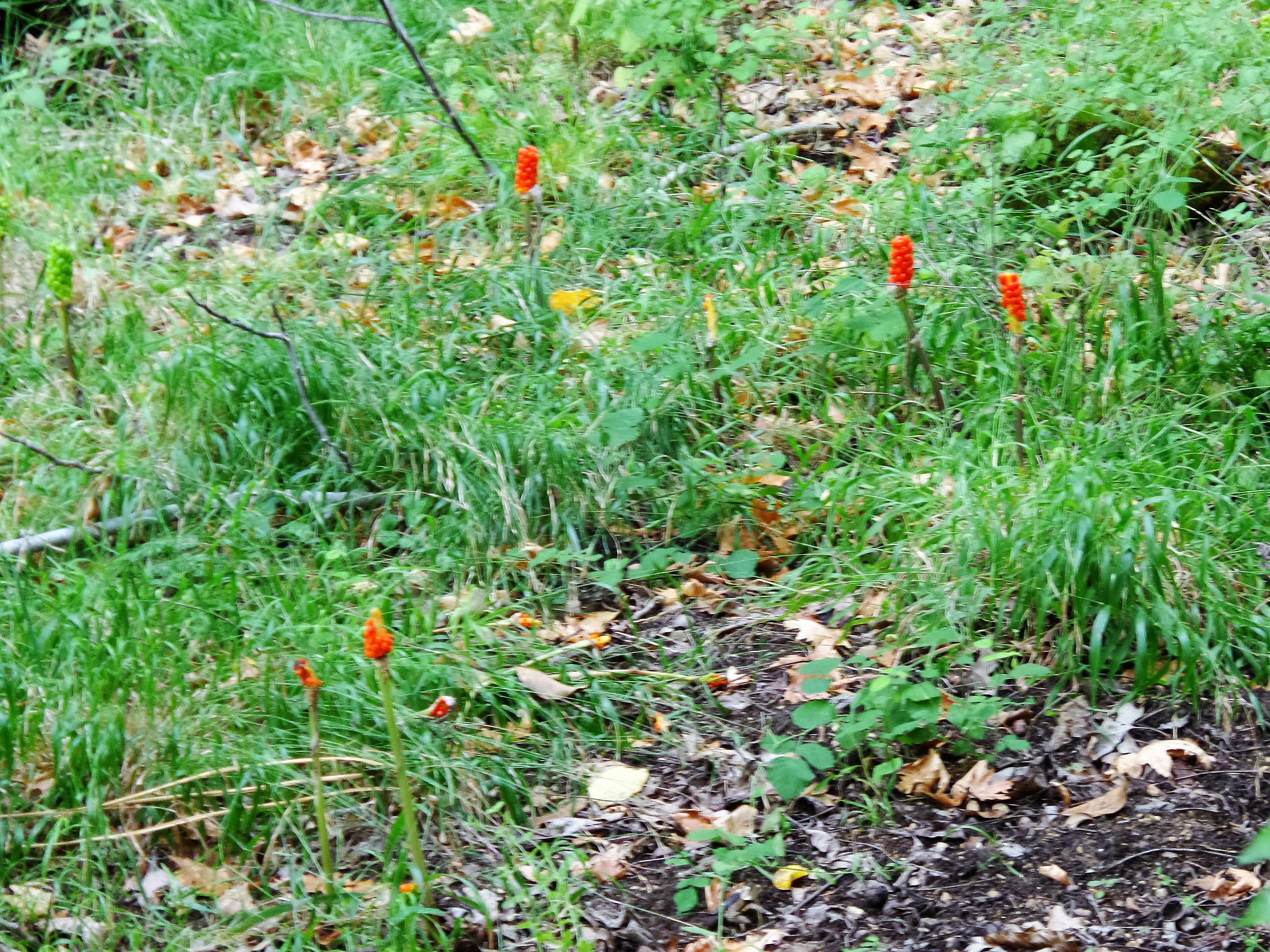
Fruiting

== Bibliography ==
- Kite, Geoffrey C.; et al. (2000). "Inflorescence odours and pollinators of Arum and Amorphophallus (Araceae)" (PDF). Reproductive Biology in Systematics, Conservation and Economic Botany. pp. 295–315. ISBN 1900347628.
- Hruby, Johann (1912). "Le genre Arum: Aperçu systématique avec considérations spéciales sur les relations phylogénétiques des formes" [The Genus Arum: A Systematic Overview with Special Considerations on the Phylogenetic Relations of its Forms]. Bulletin de la Société botanique de Genève II (in French) (4). Geneva: 113–160. ISSN 0366-3108.
