= Arum × sooi =

Scientific classification
- Kingdom: Plantae
- Clade: Tracheophytes
- Clade: Angiosperms
- Clade: Monocots
- Order: Alismatales
- Family: Araceae
- Genus: Arum
- Species: A. × sooi

Binomial name
- Arum × sooi Terpó

Species of plant

Arum × sooi is a hybrid species of flowering plant within the family Araceae. The species resulted from hybridisation between the diploid Arum cylindraceum and the tetraploid Arum maculatum. Arum × sooi is native to temperate Europe, where it can be found inhabiting the countries of Hungary and Spain.
