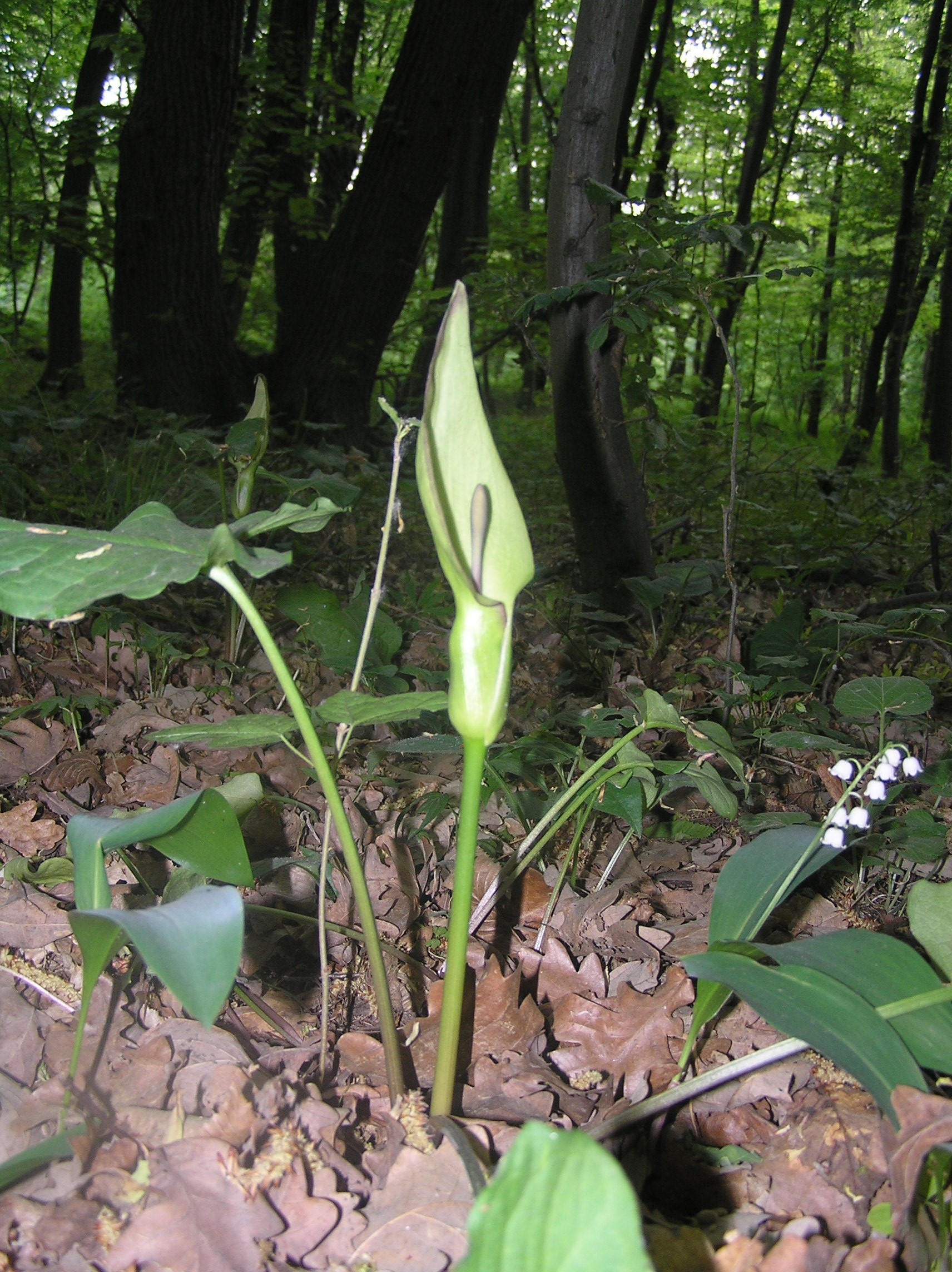

Scientific classification
- Kingdom: Plantae
- Clade: Tracheophytes
- Clade: Angiosperms
- Clade: Monocots
- Order: Alismatales
- Family: Araceae
- Genus: Arum
- Species: A. cylindraceum

Binomial name
- Arum cylindraceum Gasp. (1829)

Subspecies
- Arum cylindraceum subsp. cylindraceum; Arum cylindraceum subsp. pitsyllianum Hadjik., Hand & G.Mans.

Synonyms
- Arum alpinum Schott & Kotschy; Arum italicum var. cylindraceum (Gasp.) Nyman (1882)

= Arum cylindraceum =

Species of plant

Arum cylindraceum is a woodland plant species of the family Araceae. It is found in most of Europe except the UK, Russia, Ukraine, Belarus, the Baltic States and Scandinavia (although it is found in Denmark), and in Turkey. It is also missing in northwestern France and southern Italy.

== Description ==
The plain green leaves of A. cylindraceum appear in early spring (late March–early May) followed by the flowers borne on a poker-shaped inflorescence called a spadix, which is partially enclosed in a grass-green spathe or leaf-like hood. The flowers are hidden from sight, clustered at the base of the spadix with a ring of female flowers at the bottom and a ring of male flowers above them. Above the male flowers is a ring of hairs forming an insect trap. Insects are attracted to the spadix by its faecal odour and a temperature warmer than the ambient temperature. The insects are trapped beneath the ring of hairs and are dusted with pollen by the male flowers before escaping and carrying the pollen to the spadices of other plants, where they pollinate the female flowers. The spadix is pale chocolate brown to dark purple.

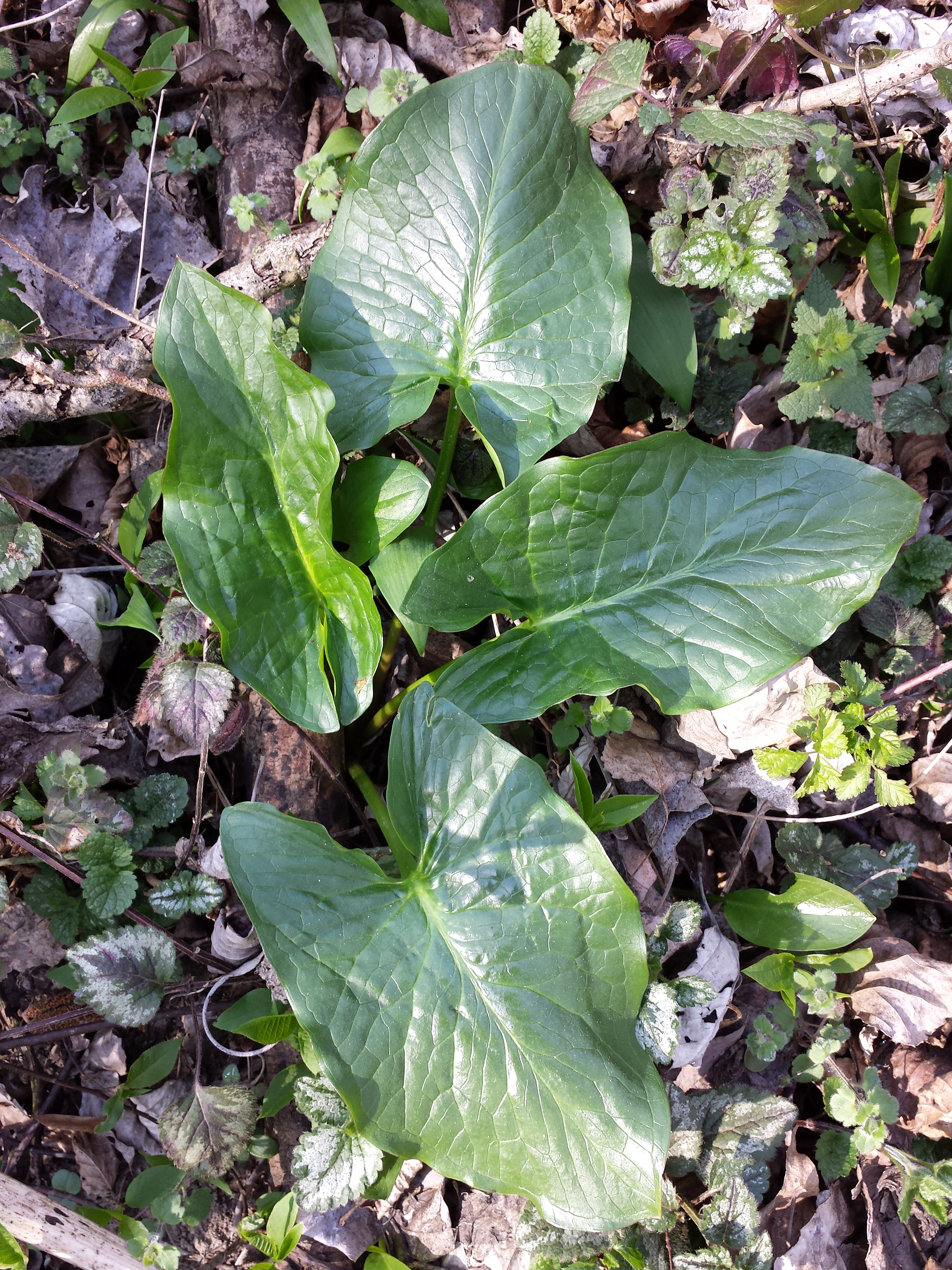

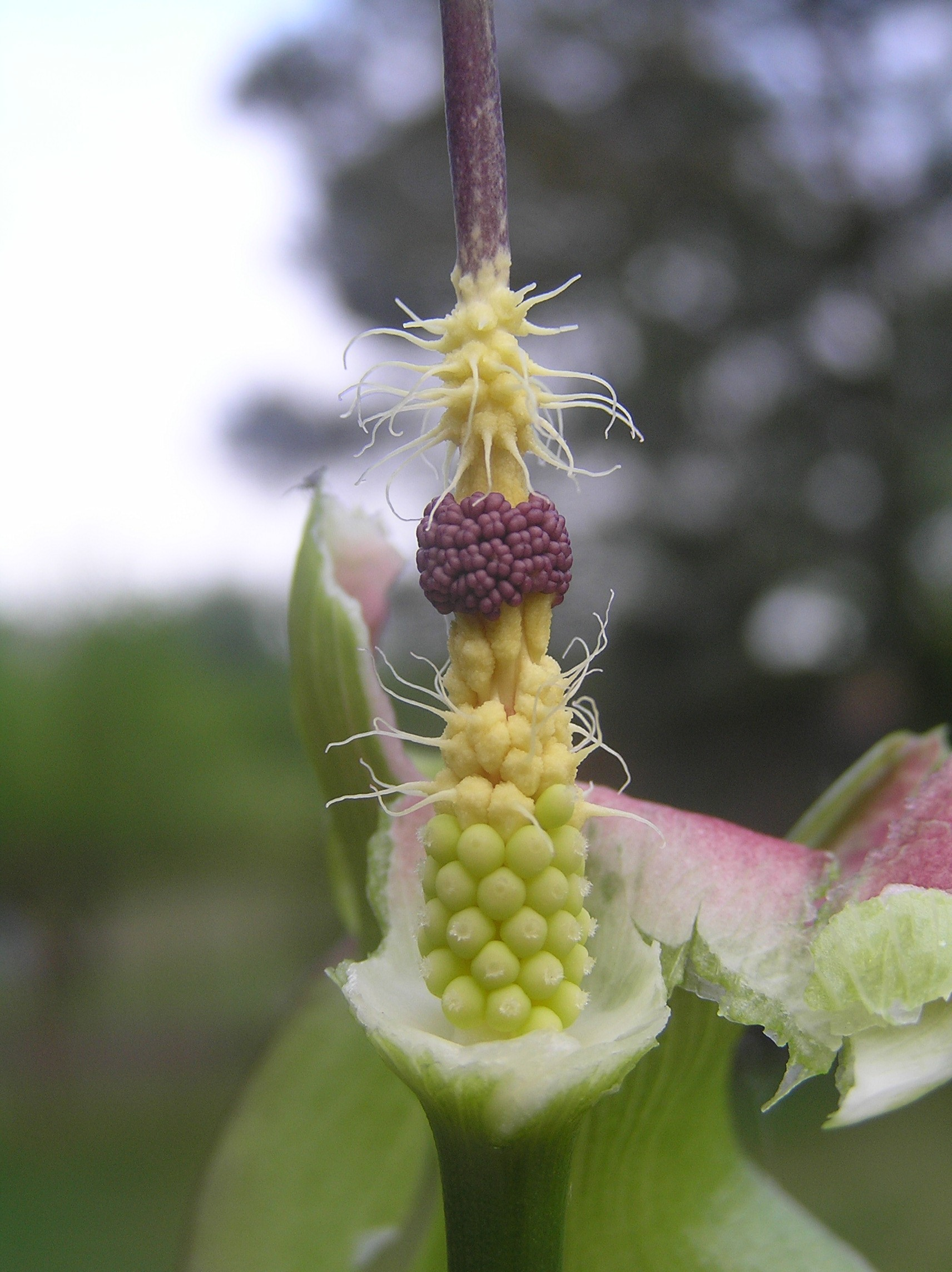

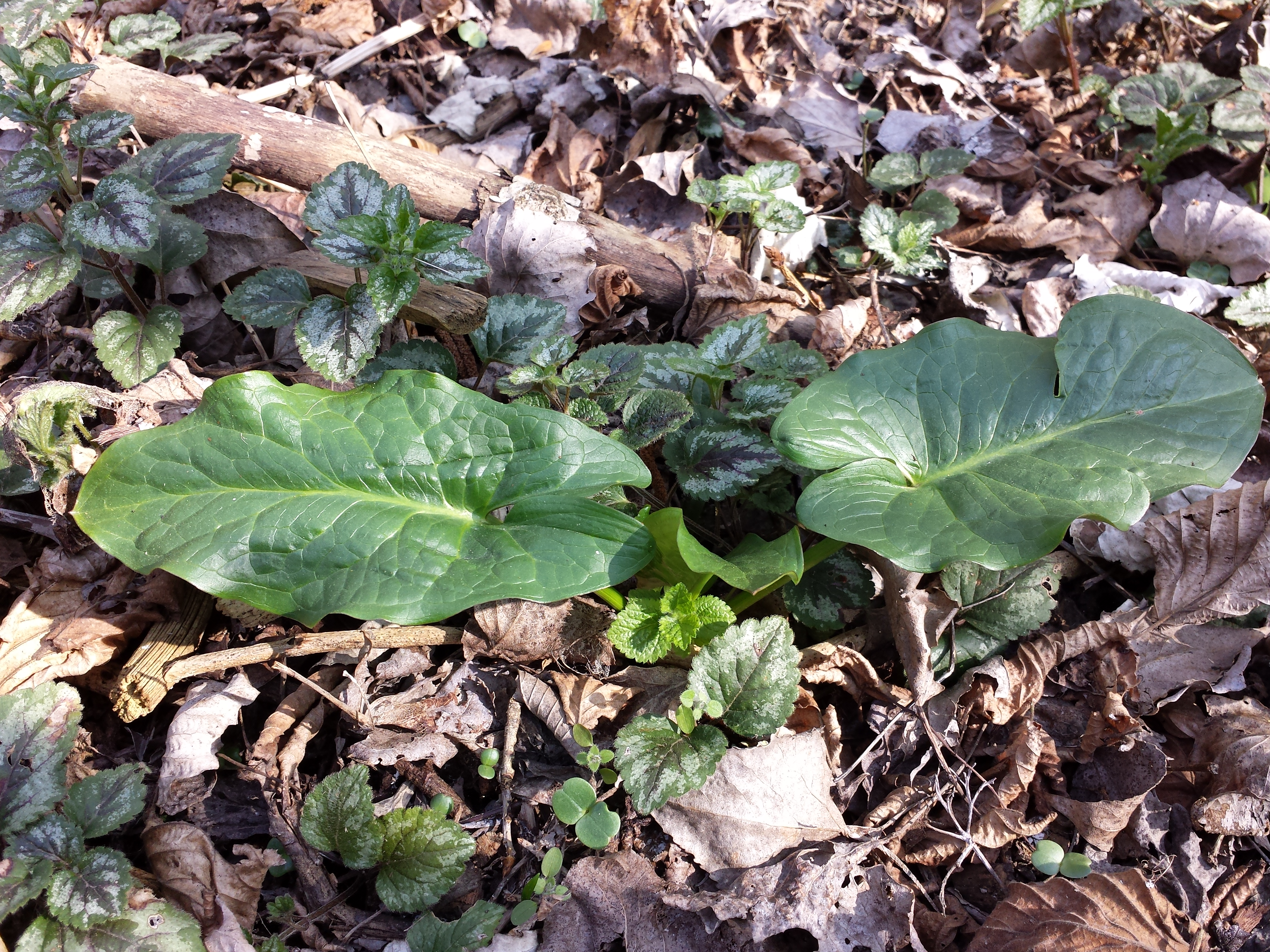

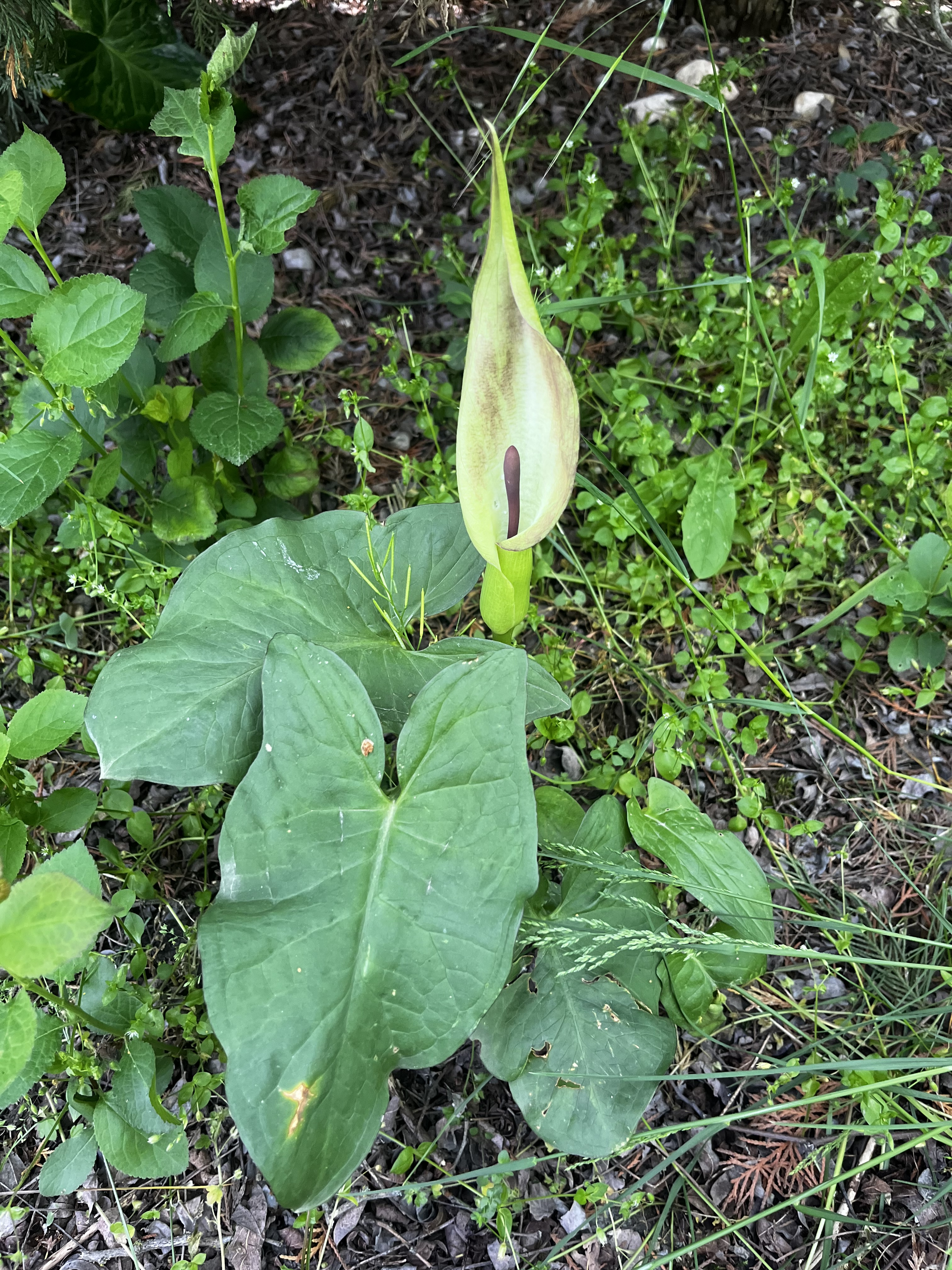

In autumn, the lower ring of (female) flowers forms a cluster of bright red berries which remain after the spathe and other leaves have withered away. These attractive red to orange berries are extremely poisonous. The berries contain oxalates of saponins which have needle-shaped crystals which irritate the skin, mouth, tongue, and throat, and result in swelling of the throat, difficulty breathing, burning pain, and upset stomach. However, their acrid taste, coupled with the almost immediate tingling sensation in the mouth when consumed, means that large amounts are rarely taken and serious harm is unusual.

All parts of the plant can produce allergic reactions in many people and the plant should be handled with care. Many small rodents appear to find the spadix particularly attractive; finding examples of the plant with much of the spadix eaten away is common. The spadix produces heat and probably scent as the flowers mature, and this may attract the rodents. It is scentless to humans, however.

In areas where both A. cylindraceum and A. maculatum are found, they are easily confused. A. cylindraceum, however, does not usually occur in the wild in the UK, but in Central Europe both species are found, often growing in the same locations.

The only characteristic that sets the two species apart with certainty all year is the tuber, which is horizontal with A. maculatum but vertical with A. cylindraceum.

Other differences are:

- The spadix is around 2/3 as long as the spathe; with A. maculatum it is only 1/2 as long. The spadix of A. cylindraceum is never yellow, which it can be with A. maculatum.
- A. cylindraceum never has spotted leaves (except when hybridizing with A. maculatum). Note that A. maculatum, despite the name, does not always have spotted leaves (e.g. A. maculatum var. immaculatum).
- The cluster of berries is up to 7 cm with A. cylindraceum, and up to 4 cm with A. maculatum.
- The spathe is greener with A. cylindraceum, not quite as pale as with A. maculatum.

== Subspecies ==
Two subspecies are accepted.

- Arum cylindraceum subsp. cylindraceum – Sweden, Denmark, middle Europe, southeastern Europe, Turkey, Corsica, and the Iberian Peninsula
- Arum cylindraceum subsp. pitsyllianum Hadjik., Hand & G.Mans. – Cyprus

== Habitat ==
Throughout the area it is found in deciduous woodland or on the edges of coniferous woodland, preferring partly shade and somewhat moist conditions. It is found up to 1700m, lower in the northern part of the area. In the southern part it is also found on grassy or rocky slopes and pastures.

== Taxonomy ==
Within the genus, it belongs to subgenus Arum, section Alpina.

A. cylindraceum has a chromosome count of 2n = 28.

A. alpinum is now considered a synonym of A. cylindraceum, but certain subspecies such as A. alpinum ssp. danicum were long held to be a representative of another species. The name A. alpinum is, however, now considered obsolete in all cases.

== Uses ==
In medieval Denmark, then including parts of Germany and Sweden, starch from the tubers (also from A. maculatum) was used to stiffen clerical collars, but as the tubers contain a caustic sap that caused blistering of the hands, this was abandoned when starch from wheat became available. Today colonies of A. cylindraceum are still found close to church sites, although the species seems to have died out in southern Sweden.

== Bibliography ==
- Linz, Jeanine; Stökl, Johannes; Urru, Isabella; Krügel, Tamara; Stensmyr, Marcus C.; Hansson, Bill S. (2010-04-01). "Molecular phylogeny of the genus Arum (Araceae) inferred from multi–locus sequence data and AFLPs". Taxon. 59 (2): 405–415. Bibcode:2010Taxon..59..405L. doi:10.1002/tax.592006. eISSN 1996-8175.
- Dring, J. V.; Kite, G. C.; Nash, R. J.; Reynolds, T. (January 1995). "Chemicals in aroids: a survey, including new results for polyhydroxy alkaloids and alkylresorcinols". Botanical Journal of the Linnean Society. 117 (1): 1–12. doi:10.1111/j.1095-8339.1995.tb02373.x. ISSN 0024-4074.
