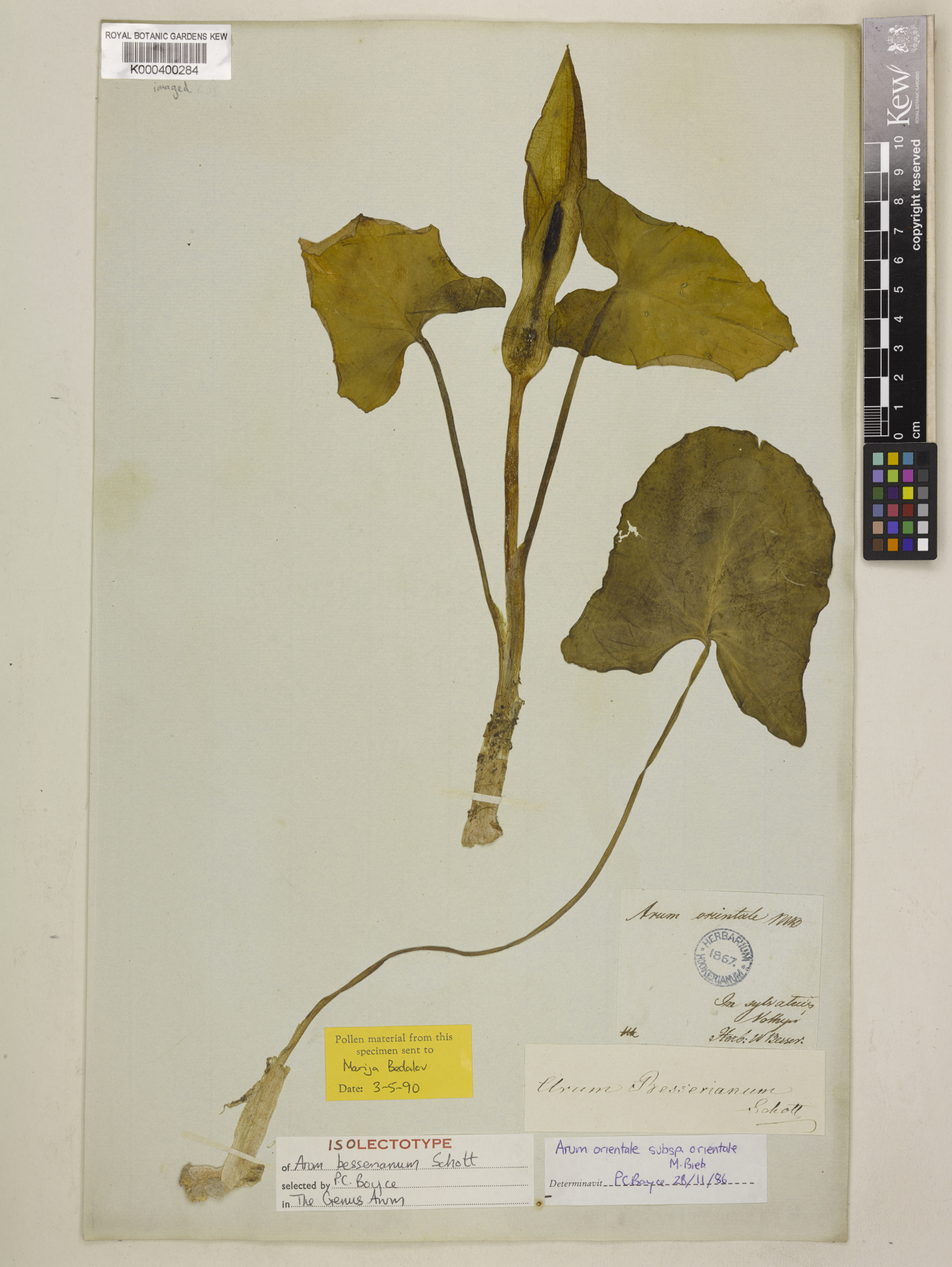

Scientific classification
- Kingdom: Plantae
- Clade: Embryophytes
- Clade: Tracheophytes
- Clade: Angiosperms
- Clade: Monocots
- Order: Alismatales
- Family: Araceae
- Genus: Arum
- Species: A. besserianum

Binomial name
- Arum besserianum Schott

Synonyms
- Arum maculatum subsp. besserianum (Schott) Nyman; Arum besserianum var. miodoborense Szafer; Arum besserianum f. miodoborense (Szafer) Terpó; Arum orientale subsp. besserianum (Schott) Holub

= Arum besserianum =

Species of flowering plant

Arum besserianum is a species of flowering plant in the family Araceae.

== Habitat ==
Arum besserianum grows in southern Poland and northwest Ukraine.

== Taxonomy ==
Within the genus Arum, it belongs to subgenus Arum, section Dioscoridea, and subsection Discroochiton. Its specific status has been considered dubious, but it has been recognized as a valid species in recent studies.
