= Arum euxinum =

Scientific classification
- Kingdom: Plantae
- Clade: Tracheophytes
- Clade: Angiosperms
- Clade: Monocots
- Order: Alismatales
- Family: Araceae
- Genus: Arum
- Species: A. euxinum

Binomial name
- Arum euxinum R.R.Mill

Species of flowering plant

Arum euxinum is a plant of the arum family (Araceae). It is native to the area of northern Turkey that borders the Black Sea.
